= Caleb Ridley =

Caleb A. Ridley (August 22, 1873 – January 22, 1932) was Imperial Kludd (National Chaplain) of the 1915 Ku Klux Klan, appointed to the position by Imperial Wizard William Joseph Simmons. Ridley was a Baptist minister and spoke on behalf of the KKK at rallies in the 1910s and 1920s. In 1923, Ridley was arrested for a DUI by police in Georgia, after which his ministers license was revoked by the Baptist church. Afterwards, Ridley worked closely with Roy Elonzo Davis, second in command of the 1915 KKK, to found the Pentecostal Baptist Church of God denomination in 1928 and 1929. William Branham participated in revival meetings with Ridley in 1929. Ridley was mentioned in a 1943 scheme that defrauded donors by collecting charitable contributions to build an orphanage in San Bernardino county, California.
