= Eldon Edwards =

American Ku Klux Klan member (1909–1960)

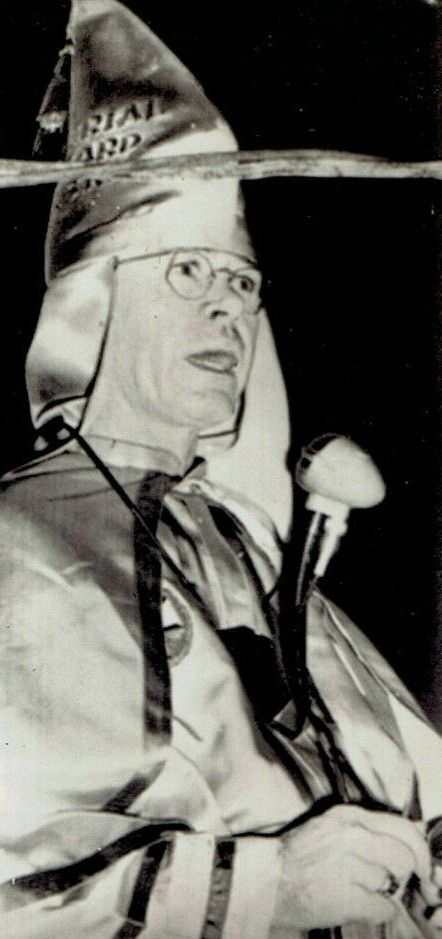

7th Grand Wizard of the Knights of the Ku Klux Klan
- In office 1950–1960
- Preceded by: Samuel Roper
- Succeeded by: Roy Elonzo Davis

Personal details
- Born: June 8, 1909 Georgia, U.S.
- Died: August 1, 1960 (aged 51) Atlanta, Georgia, U.S.

Eldon Lee Edwards (June 8, 1909 – August 1, 1960) was an American Ku Klux Klan leader.

== Biography ==
Edwards was an automobile paint sprayer from Atlanta, Georgia, and rebuilt the Klan beginning in 1953. In his book The Informant: The FBI, the Ku Klux Klan, and the Murder of Viola Liuzzo, Gary May notes that Edwards became prominent at a time when the Klan was splintered into different local groups. Edwards succeeded Samuel Roper and was elected leader of the third KKK which was reestablished at Stone Mountain by Samuel Green in 1946, the successor of the second KKK. In 1955, Edwards created his own organization, "U.S. Klans, Knights of the Ku Klux Klan", and established a 15,000 strong following in nine south eastern American states. In the late 1950s, Edwards joined forces with Roy Elonzo Davis who was Imperial Wizard of the Original Knights of the Ku Klux Klan, and one of the founding members of the second KKK who was leading the KKK in the western southern states. Edwards appointed Davis as Grand Dragon of the KKK in Texas in 1958 in an effort to merge their organizations.

Edwards was interviewed by Mike Wallace on May 5, 1957, as noted in Wallace's 2006 book Between You and Me. Wallace confronted Edwards over his racism and the violence of the KKK. Edwards explained to Wallace that he believed segregation was instituted by God, and cited various bible verses to support his position. He insisted that racial segregation was a key tenet of true Christianity, and rejected the teachings of other Christian leaders who supported racial integration.

Edwards, long diagnosed with heart disease, died of a heart attack in Atlanta on August 1, 1960. In his last public appearance, Edwards said, "We have more right to organize than the communists and the NAACP," and added, "We white people are the inheritors of this country. We do not intend to surrender it." When Edwards died, his KKK organization splintered as different men attempted to take leadership. Roy Davis claimed to news media that he was the true successor of Edwards, claiming to have been elected to the position in 1959.

Preceded by Samuel Roper	Imperial Wizard of the Ku Klux Klan; 1950–1959	Succeeded by Roy Elonzo Davis, Robert Shelton
