= Roy Elonza Davis =

American Ku Klux Klan member (1890–1966)

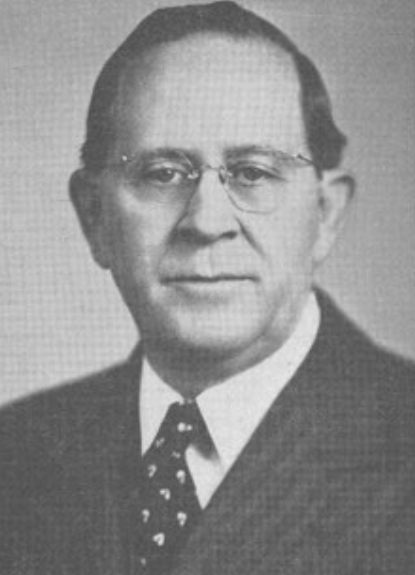
- Davis in 1950

8th Imperial Wizard of the Knights of the Ku Klux Klan
- In office 1959–1964
- Preceded by: Eldon Edwards
- Succeeded by: Robert Shelton

Mayor of Meigs
- In office January 12, 1922

Personal details
- Born: April 24, 1890 Omaha, Texas, U.S.
- Died: August 12, 1966 (aged 76) Dallas, Texas, U.S.
- Spouse(s): Emma Sabina Dowdy (m. 1911); Elva Cotta Gravley (m. 1917); Allie Lee Garrison (m. 1930)
- Children: 4

Roy Elonza Davis (April 24, 1890 – August 12, 1966) was an American preacher, white supremacist, and con artist who co-founded the second iteration of the Ku Klux Klan in 1915. Davis was Second Degree (second in command) of the KKK under William J. Simmons and later became National Imperial Wizard (leader) of the Original Knights of the Ku Klux Klan. He worked closely with Simmons, and was a co-author of the 1921 KKK constitution, bylaws and rituals. Davis spent decades as a KKK recruiter, at one point being named "Royal Ambassador" and an "Official Spokesperson" of the KKK by Simmons. Davis and Simmons were both expelled from the KKK in 1923 by Hiram Wesley Evans, who had ousted Simmons as leader. Simmons started the Knights of the Flaming Sword branch of the KKK and with Davis's help retained the loyalty of many KKK members. Davis was later reappointed second in command of the national KKK organization by Imperial Wizard Eldon Edwards, a position he held until being elected national leader by 1959.

Davis used religious meetings and revivals as a tool for KKK recruitment and was a traveling evangelist and pastor, founding churches in Texas, Arkansas, Tennessee, Indiana, and Kentucky. Davis was arrested and jailed at least 17 times between 1916 and 1961 on charges of fraud, grand theft, petty theft, forgery, illegal firearms possession, trafficking a minor, cross burning, and libel. Davis was convicted at least twice and served prison terms during 1917–1918 and 1940–1942. Based in Dallas during the 1950s and 1960s, Davis was also investigated in connection to the 1963 assassination of John F. Kennedy.

== Early life ==
Davis was born on April 24, 1890, in Omaha, Texas, as one of eleven children to Joshua Savington Davis and Mary Elizabeth McCoy. In 1906, Davis was living in El Paso, Texas, where he was employed as a clerk at the Southwest Railroad. By 1912, at age twenty-two, Davis was traveling regularly and preaching as a Christian minister connected to the Baptist Missionary Association.

=== Criminal career ===
Throughout his adult life, Davis was regularly involved in criminal activity and various money making schemes. In 1912, he began traveling to multiple states and selling "Electro Galvanic Rings" which claimed could cure rheumatism. Later that year he was arrested and charged based on complaints filed against him. Davis was indicted by a grand jury and held for trial. The judge set his bond, permitting him to leave jail.

Davis was a nearly lifelong member of the KKK. Davis told newspaper reporters that he had been a KKK member since 1915. Davis was reported to be among the founding members of the William J. Simmons revival of the Ku Klux Klan. Davis also told newspaper reporters that he was a coauthor of the KKK's constitution, bylaws and rituals which were first published in 1921.

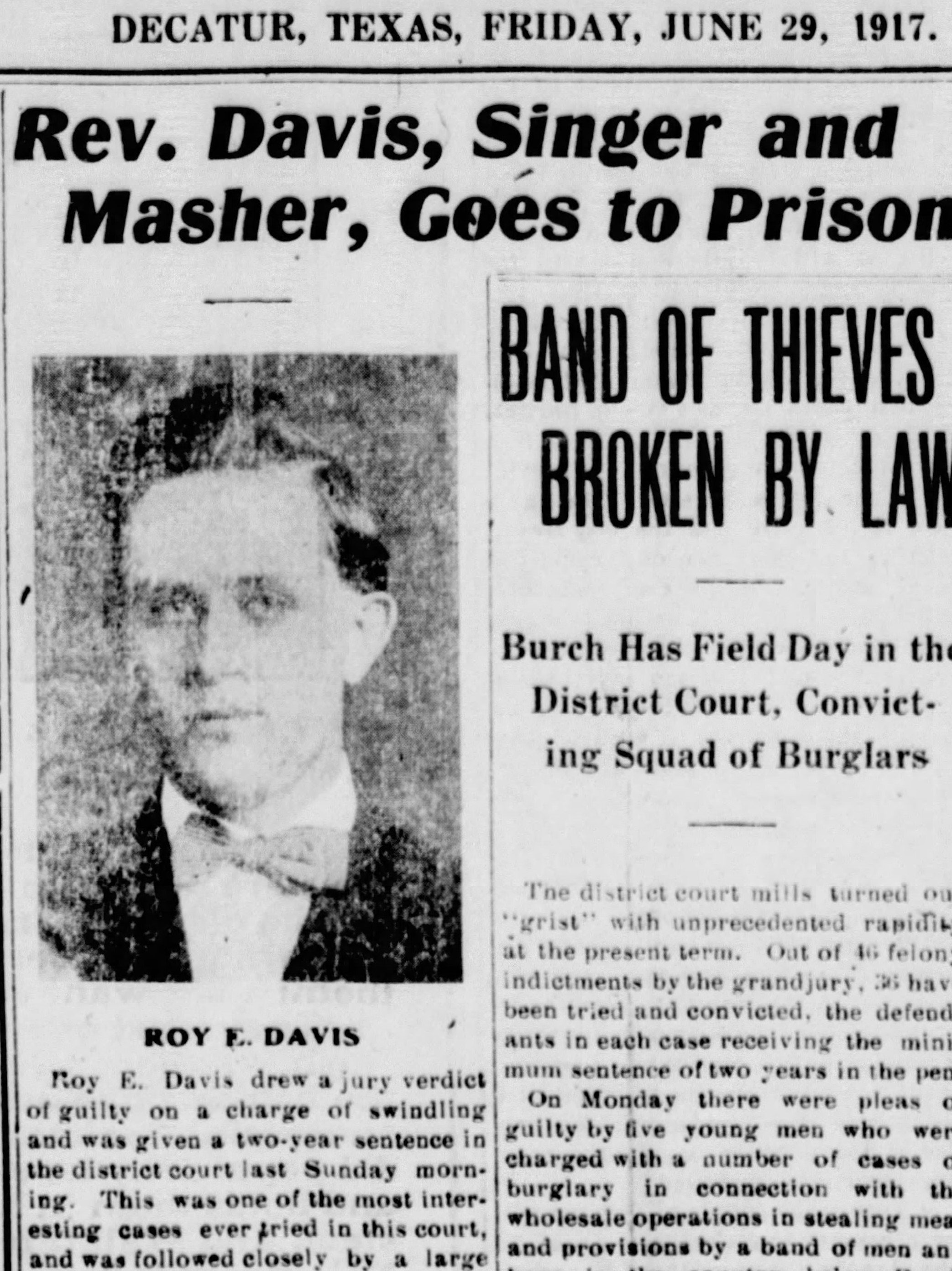
Davis' conviction for swindling and forgery was recorded in the Wise County Messenger on June 29, 1917.

Davis continued to commit fraud across the American South. In 1916, he went on a forgery crime spree with his brothers who seem to have operated with him as a gang. Davis presented himself as a minister at a bank asking them to cash a fraudulent cashier's check created by his brother who presented himself as a business owner making a donation to Davis's ministry. Davis's swindle involved multiple banks, including Continental State Bank, First State Bank, and Toyah Valley State Bank in west Texas during 1916. Davis was pursued by local law enforcement for his crimes causing him to flee the state. He abandoned his wife Emma and their three children in Texas and fled to Georgia where he took the alias of Lon Davis and married another woman, Elva Gravley. Davis was apprehended in Georgia during May 1917 after being turned in by a woman who recognized him and was upset that he had abandoned his Texas family and remarried illegally. Davis was returned to Texas where he was convicted on swindling and forgery charges and given a two-year jail sentence on June 29, 1917.

By January 1919, Davis was released from prison, returned to Acworth, Georgia, and had resumed preaching as a Missionary Baptist minister under the name Lon Davis. Davis posed as a Christian missionary bound for Egypt to gain the trust of the community and was later offered the pastorship of the Acworth Baptist Church during the summer of 1920. In 1921 Davis started publishing The Progress newsletter from the church. The newsletter focused on exposing what Davis believed were secret subversive activities of the Catholic Church. Davis also began holding Ku Klux Klan meetings at the church. Although unknown to his church, Davis had been appointed by Imperial Wizard William Joseph Simmons as an official spokesperson for the KKK and charged with organizing new chapters of the KKK. Members of his church became upset about some of the material Davis published in The Progress and began investigating his past. They soon discovered his criminal record in Texas, and discovered he had abandoned his wife and children. At a meeting on July 14, 1921, he was removed as pastor. A newspaper article covering the event contained information suggesting that Davis had been involved organizing KKK groups at Baptist churches in multiple other cities in South Carolina and Georgia.

Davis ran into legal problems again in 1921. He purchased the printing press for The Progress newsletter using a fraudulent check, swindling the seller out of $1,000. After being exposed in Georgia, Davis left the state, leaving by train with his wife and their five-year-old daughter. They traveled to Oklahoma where Davis continued holding revival meetings in Baptist churches and conducting KKK recruiting. On January 12, 1922, as Russell "R.E." Davis, he was elected as mayor of Meigs, Georgia.

== Ku Klux Klan ==
In 1922, Davis returned to Georgia where he began to speak openly supporting the Ku Klux Klan. He held rallies and meetings to recruit members in Georgia, Arkansas, Missouri, Texas, Oklahoma, Louisiana, and South Carolina. Newspapers articles at the time reported Davis to be a "high Klan official". The newspapers also began recording and reporting on his speeches in which he explained the principles of the KKK to include "white supremacy" and "protection of pure womanhood". Davis bragged about his recruitment efforts and the reach of the KKK, stating that he had been involved in recruitment across the southern and midwestern United States. He reported 92,000 KKK members in Oklahoma and Texas. Davis also boasted that governors, congressmen, and United States Senators had joined the KKK in recent years. Davis was quoted as saying "whether you approve or disapprove, the Klan is here to stay so you better watch your step."

The early 1920s were a high point for the second KKK organization. Klan recruitment was a lucrative enterprise. Recruiters got to keep a larger percentage of the membership dues paid by members. Davis was particularly effective at recruiting. During the period he traveled and held multiple rallies with Imperial Wizard William Simmons. Davis faced legal trouble again in September 1922 when complaints were filed against him in connection to a burglary case in Waco, Texas. He was accused of stealing firearms from the United States Marshalls. Davis was also named in connection to a 1923 criminal investigation in Louisiana.

The KKK started a newspaper in 1923 titled The Brick Bat based out of Meigs and Davis was named editor. The paper was published weekly and sold subscriptions to KKK members. The paper focused on what Davis described as "true Americanism" and exposition "of the principles of Ku Klux Klan". The paper was a lightning rod and stirred tensions. Their articles publicly degraded and attacked KKK opponents, calling for boycotts of unsupportive businesses. In May 1923, Davis instigated physical violence when two business owners he targeted in his publication were involved in an altercation with KKK members. Despite the violence, Davis continued to publish his attacks against Klan opponents. One of The Brick Bat's targets filed charges against Davis and he was subsequently arrested in Georgia and charged with criminal libel on June 24, 1923. Davis paid bond and returned to Klan recruiting the same day.

Somehow Davis had managed to keep his dual identities secret from many people. He had been employed as president of Georgia Farmer's Union until July 1923 when his fellow board members discovered his activities and had him investigated. They discovered he had abandoned his wife and children in Texas, had been involved in criminal activities across the United States, had remarried illegally, been dismissed as a minister from multiple churches, and was involved in the KKK. They board of the Georgia Farmers Union called a special meeting to show the results of their investigation and publicly expose Davis, but Davis failed to appear and returned to Texas. Upon being exposed, Davis and one of his brothers were subsequently caught by vigilantes in Texas and beat with wet rope. Davis's brother was hospitalized with severe injuries.

About the same time, Hiram W. Evans ousted William Simmons as Imperial Wizard of the KKK and took over leadership of the organization. Evans expelled Davis from the KKK and may have been behind his outing to the Georgia Farm Board and his beating in Texas. By 1924, Davis and Simmons regrouped and began an effort to form a new klan organization, Knights of the Flaming Sword, where Simmons resumed his role as Imperial Wizard. Davis, as a high ranking Klan leader, played a key role in encouraging members to abandoned Evans and remain loyal to Simmons in their new order. Traveling across the south, Davis successfully retained the loyalty of at least 60,000 Klan recruits and had secured over $150,000 ($2.3 million in 2021 dollars) Davis's efforts during this period earned him the accolades of Simmons who appointed Davis as "Royal Ambassador" in honor of his activities.

== Pentecostal preacher ==
In 1924, Davis moved to Tennessee to oversee a new chapter of the Knights of the Flaming Sword. At the same time Davis was working with Simmons to establish the Knights of the Flaming Sword, Davis also began efforts to formally establish the Pentecostal Baptist Church of God where he served as general overseer. After a financial scandal over misuse of funds led to the collapse of the Knights of the Flaming Sword, Davis began to refocus on building up the new denomination. He resumed traveling and holding revivals in Oklahoma and Tennessee in August 1925. Davis continued holding revival though 1926 and 1927. Davis travelled to California to hold revivals in 1927. Davis had begun to adopt Pentecostal beliefs. A newspaper article detailing Davis's criminal history reported that he had been excommunicated as a Missionary Baptist and had his minister's license revoked following an incident with baptists in Florida before 1927.

Davis began working with Caleb Ridley, Imperial Kludd (national chaplain) of the KKK, and Rev. Fred B Johnson, William Joseph Simmons chief of staff, to build a new denomination. Davis planted a First Pentecostal Baptist Church in Nashville, Tennessee where he served as founding pastor in 1928. He soon ran into issues when most of the other churches in the area refused to cooperate with his revival meetings. Davis challenged other church leaders to a debate and tensions boiled over after Davis made threats against the other ministers. One minister reported Davis's threatenings to police and filed charges against him. Davis was arrested and jailed, but was released on bond pending trial in April 1929.

To escape his impending trial, Davis fled to Louisville, Kentucky. His brothers and some church followers also moved and planted a new church for the First Pentecostal Baptist Church of God on Jefferson Street. In Louisville, Davis gained publicity after he penned an article in The Courier Journal voicing opposition to prohibition. Davis ran into legal troubles in Kentucky during March 1930 after he defrauded multiple people by soliciting donations to a fake charity. After being jailed and released on bail, Davis moved again, this time to Jeffersonville, Indiana, where he moved his First Pentecostal Baptist Church and the national headquarters of the denomination. He began in Jeffersonville by holding healing meetings at a tent revival and published advertisements in local newspapers. His revivals were supported by Ralph Rader's Pentecostal Church in Jeffersonville. Rader was brother of prominent evangelist Paul Rader. The revival meetings were very successful and lasted for two weeks.

While the revivals were still being held in Jeffersonville during September 1930, when he was 40, Davis was reported to police for living with a 17-year-old girl, Allie Lee Garrison, whom he had brought over state lines from her home in Chattanooga, Tennessee. He was accused of living with her "for immoral purposes" Davis seemed to have abandoned his second family and took up a relationship with Garrison. Law enforcement arrived mid-service to arrest Davis in front of his congregation. Davis was transferred to federal custody in Louisville where he was charged in federal court and indicted by a grand jury for violating laws prohibiting the trafficking of minors under the Mann Act. Davis fought the charges and claimed he was the foster father of the teenaged girl. He claimed to have been living with her for six years. Over sixty of his followers, mostly women, accompanied him to court to plead on his behalf. Davis successfully convinced the court to drop charges against him, but he was jailed ten days and members of his church were fined for their antics during the trial. Davis subsequently married Garrison on a trip to Mexico.

After being released from jail, Davis resumed pastoring his church in Indiana and traveling and holding revivals in other states including Ohio, Texas, Arkansas, Michigan, and Tennessee. Davis maintained a pastorship at multiple other churches he had planted and he visited regularly. In Jeffersonville, Davis continued to make news by publicly opposing prohibition. His support for alcohol proved popular in the community and attracted many people to his church. Davis was not happy with the press coverage that the local newspaper Jeffersonville Evening News gave his church. Davis was writing up articles after each service and taking it to the paper pressing them to publish his articles. After repeated refusals, Davis started a new publication called The Banner of Truth to publicize his services and aid recruitment.

In March 1930, Davis was charged with federal racketeering for the criminal activities at his Jeffersonville church, but was able to evade prosecution. Davis confessed to authorities that his Baptist minister's license had been revoked. Davis continued to run into legal problems related to his illegal activities. He was arrested again in 1931 after again soliciting donations and loans under false pretenses. Davis was extradited from Indiana to Kentucky a second time to face the charges. Davis privately paid his accusers who dropped the charges.

In 1932 Davis continued to travel regularly between the churches he had planted in Texas, Arkansas, and Tennessee holding revival meetings and conducting KKK recruitment. Davis appointed associates to serve as leaders in the churches while he was away. In the Jeffersonville First Pentecostal Baptist Church, Hope Brumback was made worship leader, and William Branham and George De'Ark were made ministering elders. He appointed his brothers Dan and W.J. as leaders of other groups. Davis began a radio broadcast in October 1933.

=== William Branham ===
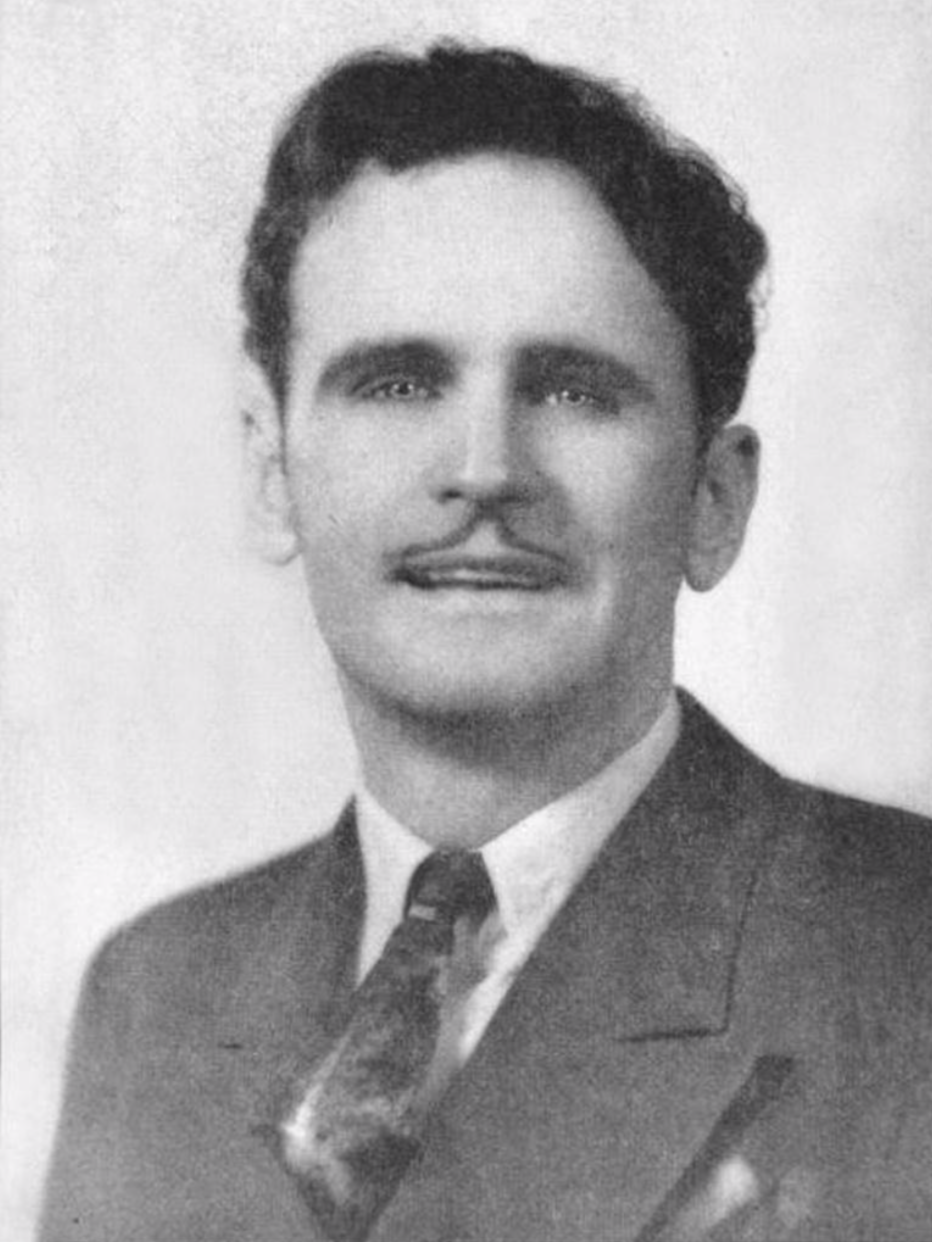
William Branham c. 1930

William Branham joined Davis's church in 1929 where he was baptized and ordained by Davis as a minister and began to serve as an elder the same year. In his sermons, Branham indicated that Christian Identity theology was being taught by elders in Roy Davis's church.

The first time I ever met anyone in my life, after I had been converted…I was…met Brother George DeArk and them down there. And I was walked, and the Lord led me to a little place. And they was discussing where the colored man came from. And they were trying to say that the colored man…That Cain married an animal like an ape, and through there come forth the colored race. Now, that's wrong! Absolutely, that's wrong! And don't never stand for that. Cause there was no colored or white, or any other different, it's just one race of people unto the flood. Then after the flood and the tower of Babel, when they began to scatter out, that's when they taken their colors and so forth. They're all come from the same tree. That's exactly right. Adam and Eve was the father and mother, earthly, of every living creature of human beings that's ever been on the earth. That's right.

— William Branham, 7-1006 – Questions And Answers On Hebrews #3 – October 6, 1957

Branham indicated in his sermons that he traveled with Davis and participated in his revival meetings. Branham was key member of Davis's inner circle and was involved in both his religious and criminal activities. Branham participated in revival meetings in Nashville with Davis and Caleb Ridley. Branham reported that in one meeting held in Memphis, Tennessee, that Davis drank sulfuric acid to make people "believe that God's real". Davis and the First Pentecostal Baptist Church financed Branham's first tent campaign meetings in June 1933 in Jeffersonville. Between March and April 1934, the First Pentecostal Baptist Church in Jeffersonville was destroyed by a fire. After being denied a permit to rebuild, Davis moved from Jeffersonville and Branham became pastor of Davis's congregation. Branham moved the group to a new building and renamed the church the Billie Branham Pentecostal Tabernacle, later changing the name to the Branham Tabernacle.

Commenting on the event, Branham stated

I remember when Brother Roy Davis, down there, and his church burnt down. That bunch of people was just like scattered sheep without a shepherd, had no place to go. And Mr. Hibstenberg was Chief of Police then, and he called me down there. He said to me, "We're here to help you." Said, "I'm Catholic, myself, but," said, "them people," said, "they don't probably have the clothes." It was during the time of the depression. Said, "They go to other churches and they feel out of place, and they're good people. I know many of them." He said, "Billy, if you want to start a church," he said, "I want you to know that we're behind you in anything we can do to help you." And I thanked him for it. We had a tag day. First, we prayed and asked the Lord. And people come to me and wanted to build a church, so could have a place to go. And we decided [on] this place.

— William Branham, Taking Sides With Jesus – June 1, 1962

Branham would later become a world famous Pentecostal evangelist in the international healing revivals of the 1940s and 1950s. Davis was proud of Branham and referred to Branham as Saint Timothy to his Saint Paul. Branham similarly spoke highly of Davis who would later participate in some Branham Campaign meetings. Branham and Davis maintained a lifelong relationship, and Branham continued to support Davis after he became national leader of the KKK.

== Imperial Wizard ==
Following the destruction of his church building in Jeffersonville, Davis began to refocus his efforts elsewhere. He transferred the national headquarters of the Pentecostal Baptist Church of God to Memphis, Tennessee later in 1934. He continued to successfully plant churches and conduct KKK recruitment. In 1936 Davis held meetings nationally, with publicized revivals in New Mexico and Florida. In 1937 Davis held publicized revival meetings in New York City, while he continued to spend much time at his church in Kingsport, Texas.

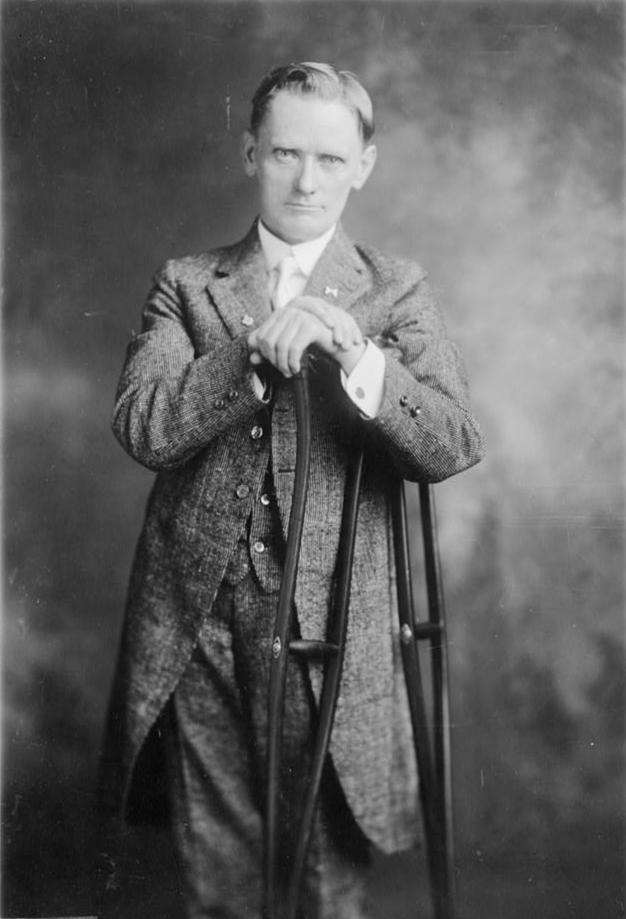
Congressman William Upshaw

Davis continued to be involved in criminal activities throughout the 1930s and 1940s. He was connected to a scheme in 1938 soliciting money for a fake charity in Indiana and Kentucky in which his brother Dan Davis and four women from his church were arrested in Newport, Kentucky. In 1939 law enforcement from Arkansas attempted to extradite Davis related to charges of theft of an automobile and a murder in Arkansas. Davis was already out on bond due to charges in Indiana at the time. Davis was located by law enforcement in Kentucky who extradited him to Arkansas. Davis plead with Kentucky authorities claiming he would be lynched by enemies if he was extradited. In Arkansas Davis spent some time in prison.

After leaving prison in November 1942, Davis and fellow KKK member, former Congressman William Upshaw, began working together in California. They set up an organization to collect money to open an orphanage. Davis was accused to stealing money from the charity in 1944 when they failed to use the collections for their stated purpose. He was arrested on three charges of grand theft, petty theft, illegal possession of firearms, and impersonating an FBI agent. The charges were dropped after Davis had his associates returned funds to several donors. Escaping charges yet again, Davis returned to holding revival meetings and KKK recruiting.

By 1950, Davis was part of the executive committee of Fort Worth Chamber of Commerce in Texas. Davis also remained active as a revivalist during the 1950s. He was working with multiple churches to hold revivals, including the Pentecostal Assemblies of God. Davis reported that he had a large tent he traveled with to preach from. The William Branham Campaign team published an article publicizing Davis and his revivals in Voice of Healing in October 1950. Davis was also present and participated in Branham Campaign events during the 1950s and was publicly endorsed by Branham. Davis continued to visit Branham campaign meetings, and be endorsed by Branham multiple times through the early 1960s.

Davis became president of the Oak Cliff White Citizens Council in Dallas Texas during the 1950s which he used as a platform to oppose racial integration. In 1958, Davis was known by law authorities to be Imperial Wizard of the Knights of the Flaming Sword in Texas, a position he had been holding for some time. Internal friction in the Klan led to issues between Davis and others KKK organizations. According to police investigation, during 1958 Davis had angered other klan members "over handling of Klan funds." Opponents burned a cross in Davis's yard prompting Davis to call the police. During questioning by police, Davis said he had been a KKK member for 45 years. He told the authorities that he was second in command of the national KKK organization at the time.

Later in 1958 Davis was offered formal leadership of the Texas branch of the KKK headed by Imperial Wizard Eldon Edwards, which Davis accepted becoming KKK Grand Dragon of Texas. As official leader in Texas, Davis continued to champion efforts to halt integration of schools and support continued segregation. Davis was successful in rallying support to halt integration of the Dallas schools that year.

By 1959 Davis had been elected leader of the national KKK organization and was reporting himself as National Imperial Wizard of the Original Knights of the Ku Klux Klan in Jonesboro, Louisiana, and conducting rallies in multiple states. In a letter published in The Waco Citizen on August 15, 1957, Davis advocated for the upholding of segregation and criticized presidential candidate John F. Kennedy for his support of the civil rights movement. He signed the letter off as "Roy E. Davis Sr., Representative of the U.S. Invisible Empire, Knights of the Ku Klux Klan". He conducted a public KKK recruitment campaign in Arkansas during May. Later that year Davis attended another large rally in Florida where he removed his mask and identified himself again national leader of the KKK. Davis was involved in organizing a national KKK convention in Jacksonville, Florida in 1960. Davis continued to be involved in fraud cases and was named in a case involving a fraudulent check in July 1960. Davis endorsed Richard Nixon for President of the United States in the election of 1960.

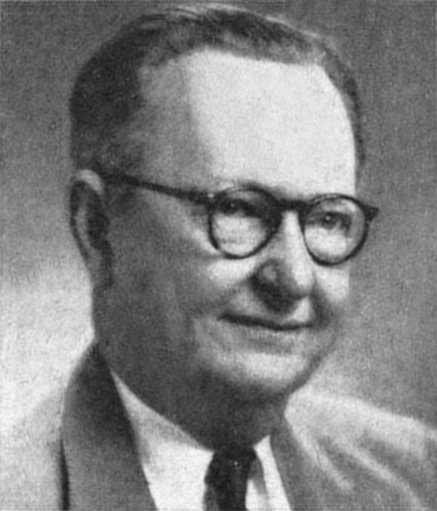
Congressman Overton Brooks was targeted by the KKK with a cross burning.

In 1961, Davis continued holding KKK rallies. The KKK adopted the motto "Yesterday, Today and Forever" in KKK promotional material. Pictures of Davis in the local newspaper showed him demonstrating a Klan salute in full KKK costume. He reported 1000 new members as a result of his campaign in Louisiana. A cross was burnt in the front yard of Congressman Overton Brooks during a Davis led KKK rally in Shreveport, Louisiana, in February 1961. Davis was questioned by authorities and denied being involved in the cross burning. Shreveport Mayor Clyde Fant declared that local authorities would not tolerate KKK activity and called Davis "unamerican" for intimidating a Congressman. Federal authorities launched an investigation following the cross burning. Davis was arrested, fingerprinted, and warned by authorities that he was not welcome in Louisiana. Davis claimed that he revoked the charter of the KKK unit in Shreveport for conducting the cross burning without his permission. Video footage of Davis was recorded leading anti-communist protests at the Burl Ives concert on December 30, 1961.

Davis continued to be deeply involved in KKK activities following his runs-ins with police, and came under deep scrutiny again following the assassination of President John F. Kennedy in Dallas in November 1963. Davis had been living in Dallas for several years and was running his faction of the KKK from there. Davis was named in an investigation by the United States Secret Service as being suspected of authoring a pamphlet entitled J.F.K Wanted For Treason shortly before the assassination.

Davis continued to travel and preach as an evangelist and conduct KKK recruitment in the later years of his life. He died in Dallas on August 12, 1966, aged 76. He was buried in Dallas's Restland Memorial Park.

== Congressional investigation ==
Congress launched an investigation of the KKK beginning in January 1966. According to John. D. Swenson's testimony to Congress, Davis was instrumental in reestablishing the KKK after it was disbanded in the post-war years. Davis had used a clause in the secret oath of 1915 KKK to reactivate the organization. Their investigation concluded that Davis had been Imperial Wizard since before 1960 and his group and leadership position had grown following a splintering of Eldon Edward's KKK in the late 1950s. They found that from his base in Dallas, Davis reactivated the KKK organization in multiple southern states. Swenson confirmed Davis played a major role in KKK organizations since at least the early 1920s. He reestablished the KKK in Louisiana in 1960 and appointed John D. Swenson as Grand Dragon of the state and as Imperial Kleage (national organizer), who led the state group from Bossier City. The KKK had a strong presence in Shreveport. By 1963, Davis had also recreated the KKK in Mississippi and Arkansas. Swenson told Congressional investigators that Davis resigned and appointed him as leader and that all records related to the KKK were destroyed in March 1964, shortly after a subpoena for the records had been issued by Congress.

Following Davis's departure in 1964, the Original Knights suffered a three-way split in their organization. Swenson was removed as leader of the Original Knights for misuse of klan funds and was replaced by Murray H. Martin. Most of the Original Knights in Louisiana followed Houston P. Morris. The members in Mississippi broke away and formed the White Knights of the Ku Klux Klan led by Samuel Bowers, who Davis had appointed Grand Dragon of Mississippi in 1961. According to an FBI report published in May 1965, the KKK was divided into 14 different organizations at the time with a total membership of approximately 9,000. The FBI reported that the Original Knights was the largest faction and had about 1,500 members. Robert Shelton of Alabama was leading a faction of 400–600 members. In 1966, Congressional investigators found that by the end of 1965 most members of Original Knights organization had joined Shelton's United Klans and the Original Knights of the KKK disbanded. Shelton's United Klan continued to absorb members from the competing factions and remained the largest Klan group unto the 1970s, peaking with an estimated 30,000 members and another 250,000 non-member supporters during the late 1960s.

== Sources ==
- Weaver, C. Douglas (2000). The Healer-Prophet: William Marrion Branham (A study of the Prophetic in American Pentecostalism). Mercer University Press. ISBN 978-0-865-54710-0.

Preceded by Eldon Edwards	Imperial Wizard of the Ku Klux Klan; 1959–1964	Succeeded by Robert Shelton
