= Colescott =

Colescott is a surname. Notable people with the surname include:

- James A. Colescott (1897–1950), American Ku Klux Klan member
- Robert Colescott (1925–2009), American painter
- Warrington Colescott (1921–2018), American etcher
