= Stetson Kennedy =

American author, folklorist, anti–Ku Klux Klan crusader (1916–2011)

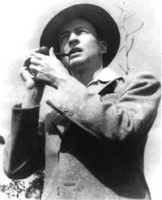
- Born: October 5, 1916; Jacksonville, Florida, U.S.
- Died: August 27, 2011 (aged 94); Jacksonville, Florida, U.S.
- Occupations: Author; activist; folklorist
- Spouse: Sandra Parks (m. 2006–2011)
- Website: stetsonkennedy.com

Signature
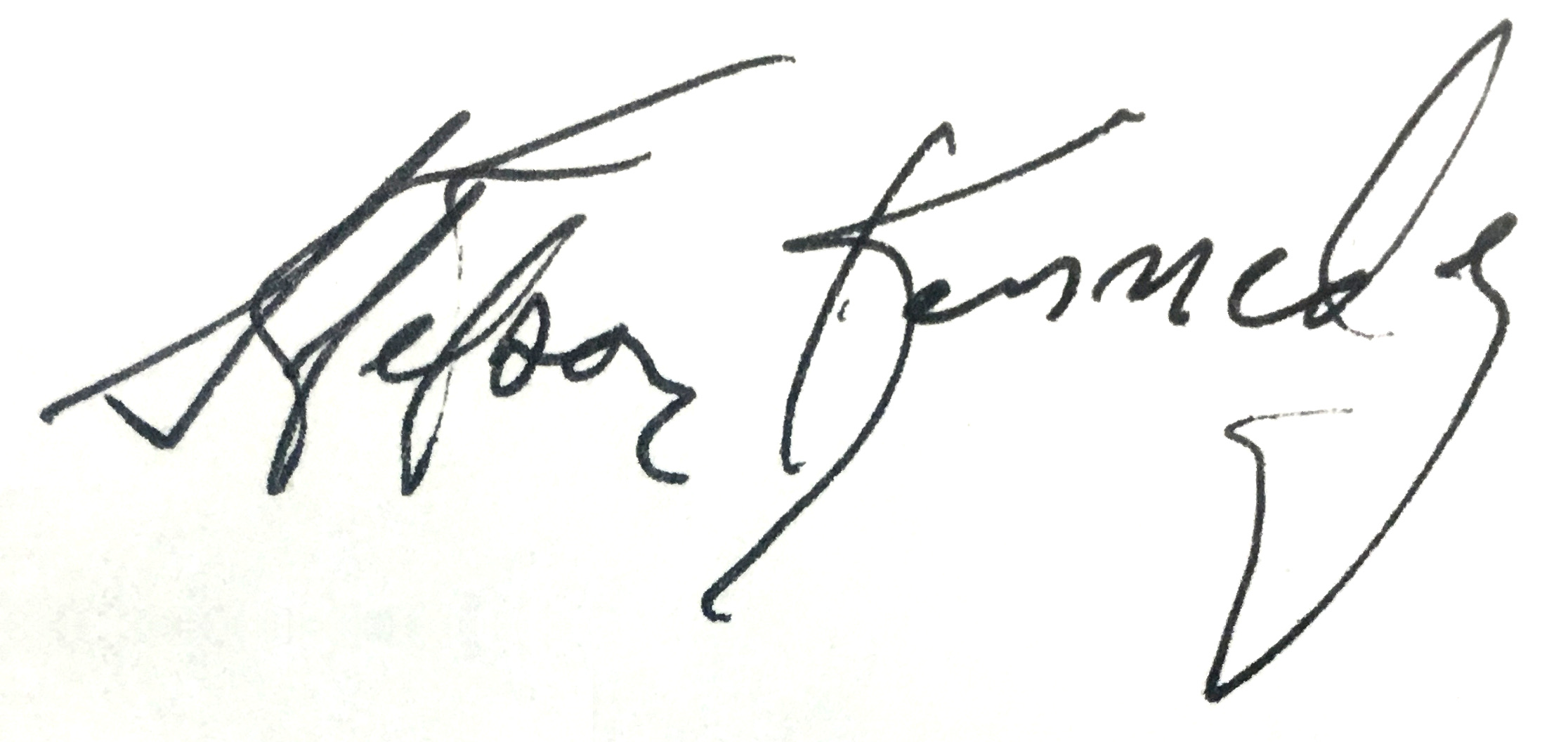

William Stetson Kennedy (October 5, 1916 – August 27, 2011) was an American author, folklorist and human rights activist. One of the pioneer folklore collectors during the first half of the 20th century, he is remembered for having infiltrated the Ku Klux Klan in the 1940s, exposing its secrets to authorities and the outside world. His actions led to the 1947 revocation by the state of Georgia of the Klan's national corporate charter. Kennedy wrote or co-wrote ten books.

== Childhood and education ==
William Stetson Kennedy, commonly known as Stetson Kennedy, was born on October 5, 1916, in the Springfield neighborhood of Jacksonville, Florida to Willye Stetson and George Wallace Kennedy. A descendant of signers of the Declaration of Independence, Kennedy came from a wealthy, aristocratic Southern family with relatives including John Batterson Stetson, founder of the Stetson hat empire and namesake of Stetson University, and an uncle "Brady" who served as the head Klan official, or "Great Titan", of a congressional district.

At a young age, Kennedy began collecting Florida folklore material and wrote poetry about Florida nature. His views on race relations in the South were largely influenced by his family's black maid, known only as "Flo", whom Kennedy considered "almost like a mother". He recalled that during his childhood in the 1920s, local Klan members beat and raped Flo for "sassing whitefolks" after she questioned a white bus driver who had given her incorrect change. Recalling this incident later in life, Kennedy said, "At a very tender age, I became aware that grownups were lying about a whole lot more than Santa Claus", in reference to the Klan's claims of being Christian patriots.

Kennedy attended Jacksonville public schools and graduated from Robert E. Lee High School during the Great Depression. In 1935, he enrolled in University of Florida (UF), leaving in 1937 without receiving a degree. He also studied at the New School for Social Research in New York and at the Sorbonne in Paris, France.

== Early writing and activism ==
In 1936, while studying at University of Florida, Kennedy collected boots and blankets for the Spanish Republic during the Spanish Civil War.

Kennedy has been called "one of the pioneer folklore collectors during the first half of the 20th century". In 1937, he left the University of Florida to join the Federal Writers' Project, the federally funded Works Progress Administration (WPA) initiative created under the New Deal to fund and support American writers during the Great Depression. As part of the Federal Writers' Project, the Library of Congress hired archivists to document the diversity of American culture by recording regional folksongs (e.g., children's songs, dance and gospel music) and oral histories in many languages and dialects. For five years, Kennedy collected Florida folklore, traveling throughout Florida alongside other notable figures such as Harlem Renaissance writer Zora Neale Hurston and folklorist Alan Lomax, among others. Kennedy had a large role in editing several volumes for the Federal Writers' Project, including The WPA Guide to Florida and A Guide to Key West of the WPA's famed American Guide Series, and The Florida Negro.

At this time, Kennedy was contributing to periodicals like PM, the New York Post, The Nation, Common Ground, The Crisis, In Fact, Southern Frontier, and Southern Patriot. He also began writing "Inside Out" a column for the Federated Press that ran from 1937 to 1950. Kennedy coined the term "Frown Power", when he started a campaign with that name in the 1940s, which simply encouraged people to pointedly frown when they heard bigoted speech.

Kennedy relied on unused material collected during his time with the Federal Writers' Project for his first book, Palmetto Country (1942). It was commissioned by Georgia writer Erskine Caldwell for the American Folkways Series. When it was published, Alan Lomax of the Library of Congress said, "I very much doubt that a better book about Florida folklife will ever be written".

In 1942, Kennedy was an editorial director for the CIO's political action committee. He wrote a series of monographs objecting to racist policies like poll taxes and white primaries because they were designed to disenfranchise minorities and poor people. Kennedy saw Southern fascist policies as part of an alliance with Northern industrialists to perpetuate a slavocracy, and this thesis was the basis of his second book, Southern Exposure.

== Infiltration of the Ku Klux Klan ==
While working for the Writers Project, Kennedy often heard stories about the KKK's terrorism. Because his bad back disqualified him for service in World War II, he decided to channel his patriotism towards combating racial injustices in the Jim Crow South. The Anti-Defamation League of B'nai B'rith helped Kennedy establish a cover identity as John Perkins. From 1942 to 1946, he lived a double life as an employee of the CIO and as a white supremacist who joined up to 20 hate groups with names like White Front, Confederate Underground, and American Gentile Army.

Kennedy moved from Miami to Atlanta to target the highest rungs of the KKK. He volunteered for former Georgia Governor Eugene Talmadge, who had been voted out of office in 1942. Though not a member, Talmadge supported the KKK and often spoke at their events. Using Talmadge as a reference, Kennedy secured a sales job with the racist magazine The Southern Outlook and managed to join the Nathan Bedford Forrest Klavern #1 of the KKK.

With the help of other informants, Kennedy filed detailed reports on the Klavern's Monday night meetings from September 1944 until November 1948. He also reported the Klan's various crimes to the Georgia Bureau of Investigation, the FBI, as well as police, prosecutors, journalists, and human rights organizations.

A folklorist by habit, Kennedy documented how the Klan drew on fraternal organizations like the Elks and the Masons. He also relished the absurd flourishes of Klan lore, such as making "K" the initial letter for most terms, renaming the days of the week "Dark, Deadly, Dismal, Doleful, Desolate, Dreadful, and Desperate", and their Byzantine handbook the Kloran. Kennedy decided to expose such "Klankraft" to public ridicule.

More importantly, Kennedy recognized that the KKK was operating in violation of its non-profit charter. In May 1946, he wrote to Governor Ellis Arnall with justifications for revoking it. By June, Arnall had announced his intention to cancel the charter. Georgia filed a quo warranto suit against the Klan, and the Klan surrendered its charter on June 13, 1947.

== Exposure of the KKK ==
Kennedy was inspired by the success of Under Cover, John Roy Carlson's exposé of American Nazis. In 1944, he was pitching a similar book organized around Roosevelt's Four Freedoms, but it took another two years of revisions to convince Doubleday to publish Southern Exposure. The book was a bestseller and a critical favorite. The Institute for Southern Studies went so far as to name their journal after Kennedy's book.

Southern Exposure is a survey of the politics of the South from the Civil War until the present, with a particular focus on labor practices and inequality. The book deals briefly and candidly with the Ku Klux Klan. Kennedy traveled to Chattanooga to interview J. B. Stoner, who did not realize the author was opposed to his work. Kennedy quotes Stoner's unvarnished racism at length. He also includes images of original Klan paperwork like Forms K-111 and K-115, applications for reinstatement and "Citizenship in the Invisible Empire". The book outraged the Klan and a bounty was put on Kennedy's head.

Kennedy fed information to law enforcement and journalists in order to engineer counteractions against the Klan. He even showed up at the House Un-American Activities Committee in his Klan robe to get their attention. Having once called the KKK "an old American institution" after allowing Imperial Wizard James A. Colescott to testify, HUAC was uninterested in Kennedy's information. His most high-profile media ally was Drew Pearson who had a nationally syndicated column and a popular radio show. Pearson regularly broadcast intelligence from Kennedy. The Klan was irate to hear its machinations made public, such as Eugene Talmadge's secret promise to appoint the KKK's Atlanta Cyclops to run the Georgia Bureau of Investigation. Pearson dubbed Kennedy "the nation's number-one Klanbuster".

=== Superman ===
On June 10, 1946, the highly popular Adventures of Superman radio show began a 16-episode story called "The Clan of the Fiery Cross". The show had previously tackled hate groups as a subject. The writers approached the Anti-Defamation League about new foes for Superman. Kennedy claims he pitched the Klan as a subject.

By 1947, the ADL was claiming Kennedy was a consultant on the show. In The New Republic, Thomas Whiteside described Superman's regular use of KKK passwords as a constant irritant to Grand Dragon Samuel Green, who was forced to listen to the show and update compromised codes. A myth took hold that the actual audio disproves. Superman never uses any code words as he takes on "the Clan".

== The Klan Unmasked ==
In early 1947, Stetson Kennedy's undercover career as John Perkins ended when he was subpoenaed to testify in the trial of Homer Loomis and Emory Burke. Loomis ran an organization called the Columbians of Atlanta, a neo-Nazi organization that Kennedy infiltrated with other operatives. His fellow Columbians were shocked to see that Perkins was Kennedy, and they attacked him in the courthouse.

Kennedy spent the spring of 1947 on a lecture tour. He moved to Greenwich Village, because the Klan made his native South unsafe for him. In New York, he collaborated with photographer Marian Palfi on Jim Crow Guide to the U.S.A. He was also writing a manuscript titled I Rode With the Ku Klux Clan, which was reissued in 1990 as The Klan Unmasked.

Unlike the journalistic Southern Exposure, where Kennedy occasionally appears in first person, The Klan Unmasked is written as a potboiler. Having struggled since 1948 to get it published, Kennedy decided that turning it into a thriller was the best way to sell it. Writing in the style of Mickey Spillane, Kennedy is a hard-boiled witness to everything from the murder of a Black man by the KKK to the "Wool Hat Putsch" by Herman Talmadge.

In Southern Exposure, Kennedy slips into the first person to relate his trip to Stone Mountain to document a Klan rally. He recasts the event in The Klan Unmasked as his formal initiation as a Klansman.

Kennedy also combined his exploits with those of other covert operatives in The Klan Unmasked. For instance, he was one of three undercover Columbians. In the book, Kennedy combines all of their data gathering into a first person narrative where he is the main character. In addition to being a more marketable story, it helped Kennedy protect the identity of his collaborators.

He eventually identified one as John Brown, who was a disillusioned Klansman. Brown was able to penetrate the highest levels of the KKK, and many of the most gripping episodes in The Klan Unmasked are presumed to have happened to him. Kennedy was acting as his handler, relaying his intelligence reports to the Non-Sectarian Anti-Nazi League that was supporting their work.

=== Criticism ===
One Klan historian called Stetson Kennedy's activism "the single most important factor in preventing a postwar revival of the Ku Klux Klan." Stephen J. Dubner and Steven Levitt amplified this overstatement in their 2005 book Freakonomics. When they learned about the fictional device in The Klan Unmasked, they retracted their error and revised the book.

Kennedy defended his work in several essays and interviews. Several of his colleagues and other historians supported Kennedy's method.

== Later career ==
Kennedy traveled to Geneva in 1950 and then to Paris. Jean-Paul Sartre wrote an introduction to the French translation of Kennedy's Jim Crow book. Kennedy traveled extensively behind the Iron Curtain after he took the subway into East Berlin. He met Maria Tănase in Romania, visited the USSR, and Hungary. His passport expired while he was in Eastern Europe, and he was officially in police custody in Paris until he was issued a new one and was able to return to America.

In 1952, when Kennedy ran for governor of Florida, his friend and houseguest Woody Guthrie wrote a set of lyrics for a campaign song, "Stetson Kennedy". The song was later set to music by Billy Bragg and recorded by Bragg and Jeff Tweedy's band Wilco on the album Mermaid Avenue Vol. II.

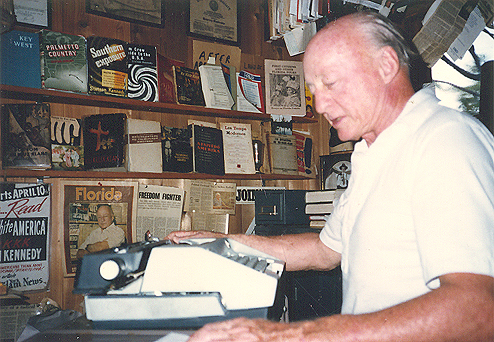
Kennedy in 1991

A founding member and past president of the Florida Folklore Society, Kennedy was a recipient of the 1998 Florida Folk Heritage Award and the Florida Governor's Heartland Award. Kennedy is also featured as one of the "Whistle Blowers", in Studs Terkel's book Coming of Age, published in 1995.

In 2007 St. Johns County declared a "Stetson Kennedy Day".

Kennedy participated in the two-day "New Deal Resources: Preserving the Legacy" conference at the Library of Congress on the occasion of the 75th Anniversary of the New Deal held in March 2008. Kennedy's most recent book, Grits and Grunts: Folkloric Key West, was issued by the Pineapple Press, in 2008.

In February 2009, Kennedy bequeathed his personal library to the Civic Media Center in Gainesville, Florida with which Kennedy had worked since the center's inception.

In October 2009, a first party for Kennedy's 93rd birthday was held at the Civic Media Center and the next day admirers flocked to Beluthahatchee Park, now a landmarked historic site, to celebrate Kennedy's birthday there.

== Personal life ==
According to friends, he was married seven times, though Kennedy only admitted to five marriages, stating, "I'll leave it to the historians to decide how many times I've been married." His first marriage was in 1936 to Edith Ogden-Aguilar, a Cuban émigré he met in Key West, Florida while doing fieldwork for his own writing shortly after leaving UF.

In 1942, he had a son, Loren Stetson Kennedy, his only child.

After fleeing Budapest with his Hungarian wife during the Hungarian Revolution of 1956, Kennedy was held in detention in Paris for over a year after his passport was confiscated by the U.S. government due to McCarthyism.

In 2006, at 90 years old, Kennedy married writer and bookstore owner Sandra Parks, a former city commissioner of St. Augustine, Florida. They remained married until Kennedy died in 2011.

== Legacy ==
=== Beluthahatchee Park ===
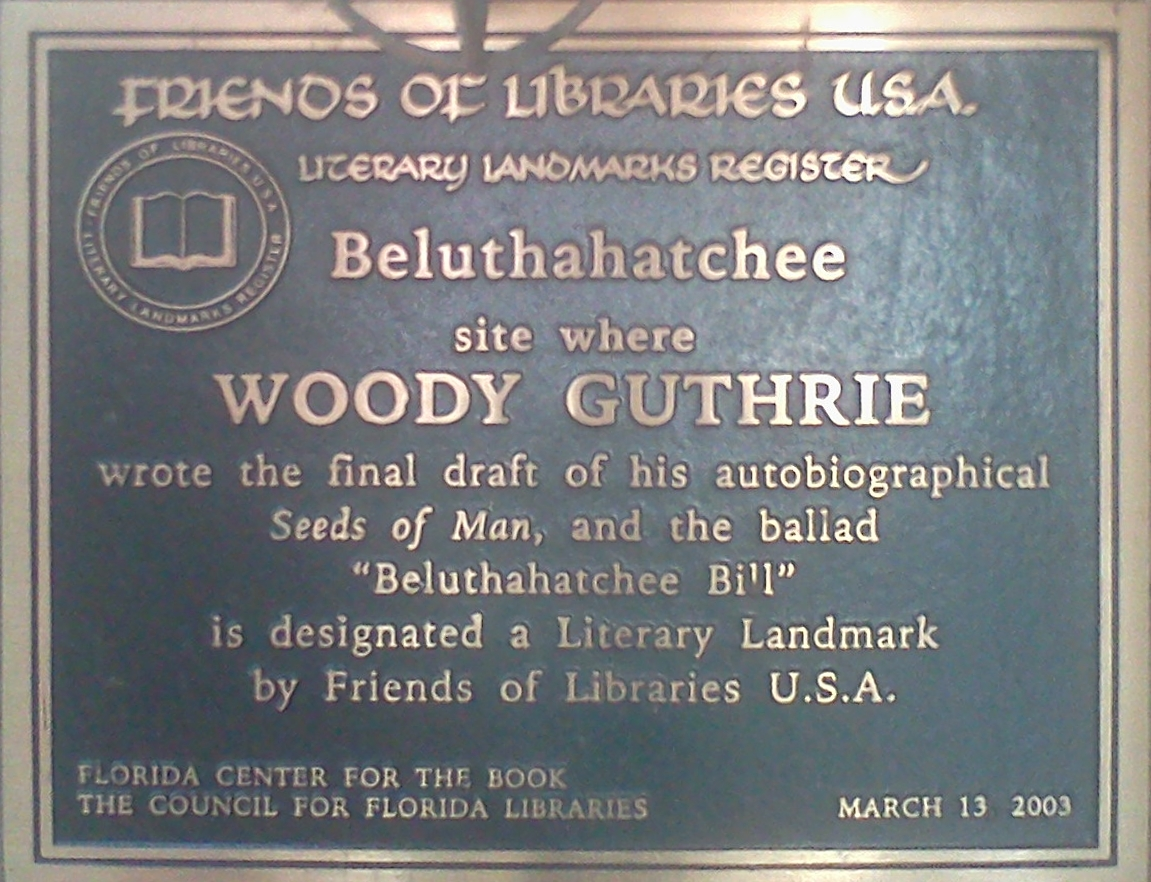
Sign on Stetson Kennedy's residence erected consequent to the 2003 designation of Beluthahatchee as a Literary Landmark, No. 83 in the National Register. (An additional marker, in Kennedy's name, was also approved, to be erected following his demise.)

In 2003, Friends of Libraries USA put Beluthahatchee on its national register of literary sites and, to commemorate the occasion, Arlo Guthrie gave a concert in Jacksonville.

In 2005 Kennedy received a life estate on his 4-acre homestead in Saint Johns County, and it is now Beluthahatchee Park.

The name "Beluthahatchee" describes a mythical "Florida Shangri-la, where all unpleasantness is forgiven and forgotten" according to Zora Neale Hurston.

Among the amenities are a picnic pavilion, canoe dock, access to the Beluthahatchee Lake, and use of the two wildlife observation platforms. A "Mother Earth Trail" throughout the property is planned, as envisioned by the Kennedy Foundation. The Park's perimeter is surrounded by a heavy canopy of native vegetation and the enclave provides a habitat for wildlife and continues to serve as a rookery and roosting place for many types of waterfowl and other birds.

Kennedy's home has, upon his death, been opened as a museum and archive and offer educational exhibits, primarily about Woody Guthrie and William Bartram in addition to Kennedy himself, and has been operated by the Kennedy Foundation which shares office space in an adjacent home with the William Bartram Scenic and Historic Highway corridor group. A log cabin that's in the park may serve as a caretaker residence while the fourth building there may house an Artist-in-Residence through the Florida Folklife program.

The park is part of a 70-acre tract that Kennedy purchased in 1948, recorded restrictive covenants setting aside land in perpetuity as a wildlife refuge, and the following year subdivided, subsequently selling all but his own 4 acre parcel.

=== Death and memorials ===
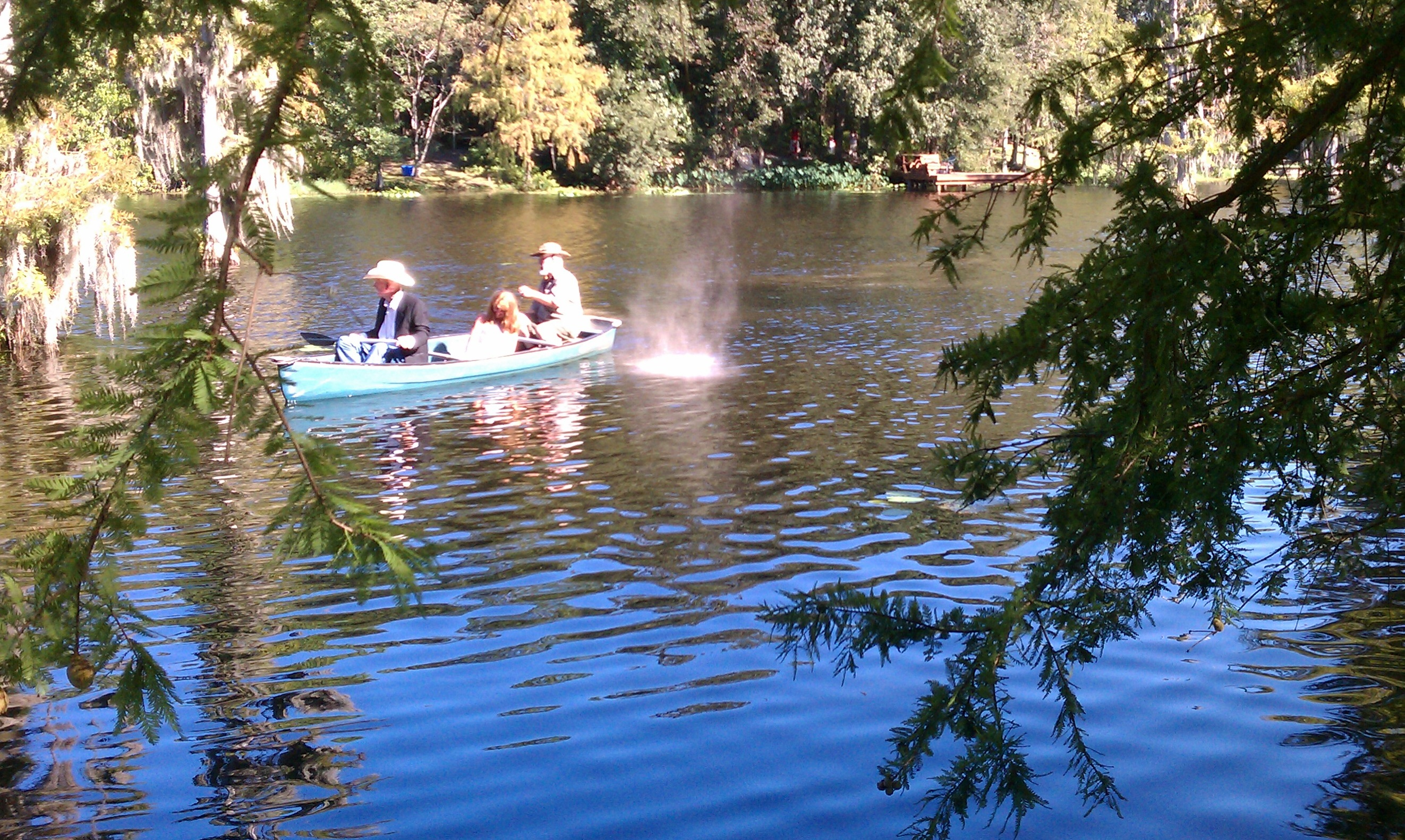
Stetson Kennedy's ashes are spread at the end of his memorial service on October 1, 2011, onto Beluthahatchee Lake.

Kennedy died on August 27, 2011, at Baptist Medical Center South in Jacksonville, Florida, where he had been in palliative care for several days.

Kennedy's stated wishes were that upon his death a party should be held rather than a funeral; therefore, a celebration of Kennedy's life was held on October 1, 2011 (four days before Kennedy's 95th birthday) at Kennedy's homestead, Beluthahatchee Park. Several hundred relatives, friends, and admirers gathered for the events which commenced with an hour of musical performances. The performances included several pieces written by Kennedy's friend Woody Guthrie, who composed many songs at Beluthahatchee, including several about Kennedy, e.g., "Beluthahatchee Bill", culminating with all present singing Guthrie's "This Land Is Your Land". This was followed by an hour of eulogies. Then all present walked down to Lake Beluthahatchee and viewed Kennedy's ashes being scattered thereon from a canoe.

== Books ==
- Mister Homer, 1939
- Southern Exposure. New York: Doubleday, 1946.

- Reissued by University of Alabama Press 2011. ISBN 978-0-8173-5672-9

- I Rode With the Ku Klux Klan. London: Arco Publishers, 1954. OCLC 3469598

- Abridged as Passage to Violence. NY: Lion Books, 1954. OCLC 70666546
- Reissued as The Klan Unmasked. University of Alabama Press 2011. ISBN 978-0-8173-5674-3

- Jim Crow Guide to the U.S.A.. Laurence and Wishart, 1949. OCLC 59060670

- Reissued by University of Alabama Press 2011. ISBN 978-0-8173-5671-2

- Palmetto Country, 1942, University Press of Florida 1989 reprint: ISBN 0-8130-0959-6, Florida Historical Society Press 2009 reprint with a new publisher's preface, updated Afterward and eighty photographs ISBN 1-886104-38-7 ; ISBN 978-1-886104-38-9
- The Jim Crow Guide: The Way It Was Before the Overcoming, 1956 at Paris, 1959, Florida Atlantic University 1990 reprint: ISBN 0-8130-0987-1
- South Florida Folklife, 1994, (coauthors Peggy A. Bulger and Tina Bucuvalas), University Press of Mississippi, ISBN 0-87805-659-9
- After Appomattox: How the South Won the War, 1995, University Press of Florida 1996 reprint: ISBN 0-8130-1388-7
- Grits and Grunts: Folkloric Key West, Pineapple Press, 2008
- The Florida Slave, The Florida Historical Society Press, September 29, 2011, ISBN 978-1-886104-48-8
