= Samuel Green (Klansman) =

American Ku Klux Klan member (1889–1949)

- Dr. Samuel Green, then with the rank of Grand Dragon, at an initiation ceremony at Stone Mountain on July 24, 1948

5th Grand Wizard of the Knights of the Ku Klux Klan
- In office August 4, 1949 – August 18, 1949
- Preceded by: James Arnold Colescott
- Succeeded by: Samuel Roper

Personal details
- Born: Samuel Green; November 18, 1889 Atlanta, Georgia, U.S.
- Died: August 18, 1949 (aged 59) Atlanta, Georgia, U.S.
- Spouse: Virginia Edenfield
- Children: 3
- Occupation: Obstetrician

Samuel Green (November 18, 1889 – August 18, 1949) was an American obstetrician who was Grand Wizard of the Knights of the Ku Klux Klan in the late 1940s, organizing its third and final reformation in 1946.

== Biography ==
Green was born on November 18, 1889 in Atlanta, Georgia, to Dr. Alfred Franklin Green, and his wife, Annie Kate Taylor.

He became an obstetrician and joined the Ku Klux Klan in 1922. By the early 1930s, Green had become the Grand Dragon of Georgia.

Starting from the late 1920s, the Knights of the Ku Klux Klan had a problem with declining membership. In 1939, Imperial Wizard Hiram Wesley Evans sold the organisation to two Klan members, Green and James A. Colescott. Colescott served as the Imperial Wizard and Green as his assistant. While Colescott was forced to dissolve the organization in 1944, Green began to reform the Association of Georgia Klans with its focus on white supremacy and anti-communism. In October 1945, his group announced their return to public life with a cross-burning.

From the autumn of 1945 to the spring of 1946, the Klan regularly signaled their presence through lighting up "huge fiery crosses" on top of Stone Mountain. During this period, Green and his associates started contacting former Klansmen and inviting them to rejoin the ranks. On May 9, 1946, this version of the Klan staged its first major initiation ceremony. In October of the same year, Green orchestrated a formal revival ceremony on Stone Mountain. According to historian Robert P. Ingalls, the fiery cross lit for the ceremony was between 200 and 300 feet in height. The initiation ceremony of the night closely followed the patters established by William Joseph Simmons in 1915. The only problem for the ceremony was that there were more members and initiates present than robes and hoods available to them. Many of them wore handkerchief masks instead of more traditional Klan uniforms. Green sold to Life magazine the rights of taking and publishing photos of the event.

New Klan units soon emerged throughout the Southern United States. Chester L. Quarles, a professor of criminal justice at the University of Mississippi, points out that new conditions in the region helped the Klan in its recruitment drive. One factor was the supposed "new assertiveness" of the Negroes. In other words, African American veterans of World War II were returning home. Having fought for liberty and freedom abroad, they were now demanding these rights for themselves in their own homeland. They were joining the Civil Rights Movement en masse. In response, the Klan re-embraced its original goals of seeking to contain and control the Negroes. In Green's own words on the subject:

...The uppity niggahs! Since the war they're even trying to abolish Jim Crow laws, with their talk of equal rights. Already the poll tax has been abolished in Georgia, and in other Southern states Northern agitators are paying poll taxes for the blacks so they may vote alongside white folks. ...

The Klan focused its recruitment drives towards White American veterans of the war who felt restless. Their rhetoric called attention to non-combatant negroes "who got all the good jobs while you were in uniform". Another factor to the revitalization of the Klan was a then-recent wave of refugees and immigrants entering the United States, including Jews who survived the Holocaust. Green described the country as having been "flooded with Jewish refugees". The Klan once again embraced both nativism and antisemitism. A third factor was that Roman Catholicism was increasing its influence over the American population, gaining new adherents. Green found this to be a disturbing trend and spoke against these "papists". The final factor was the ongoing Operation Dixie, which involved labor organizers operating in the South. The Klan was opposed to the labor movement and Green characterized these organizers as carpetbagger arriving to "tell Southerners how to run ... their business". Green assured his audience that "niggahs" (sic), Jews, Catholics, labor organizers, and any alliance between them would not be tolerated by the Klan. In his words:

The white man was born supreme. ...We didn't want to be reconstructed, and we don't want to be organized!

In this period of the Klan, it was relatively normal for Klansmen to attend church service in full uniform. The practice both asserted their predominance in their respective areas, and implied their connection to local church leaders. At times these Klansmen offered cash donations to the congregations. At least some religious figures opposed the practice. For example, Hugh A. Brimm of the Southern Baptist Convention instructed its pastors to refuse to accept "blood money" from the Klan. In his view the Klansmen were covered with the blood of "lynched victims" and their "superficial piety" was merely hypocritical. In 1947, the Klan was included in the Attorney General's List of Subversive Organizations, and denounced as Un-American. It shared the list with organizations embracing totalitarianism, fascism, and communism. While declaring itself the "American social conscience", the Klan consistently favored ignoring and disobeying laws which went against their ideology. Their rhetoric had taken an increasingly anti-statist turn.

With the Klan attracting some negative attention, it soon started facing internal problems. Their ranks were infiltrated by government informants, federal agents, and investigative journalists. All were eager to expose the violent nature of the Klan, the one Klansmen publicly denied. The most notable infiltrator was Stetson Kennedy, whose later book I Rode With The Ku Klux Klan (1954) covered the activities of the Klavalier Klub. The Klub was an elite squad of Klansmen devoted to flogging campaigns, active within Georgia itself. By 1949, following the revelations to the public, the Klan's name had become synonymous with terrorism and violence. But this reputation failed to discourage people from seeking membership. In the summer of 1949, shortly before his death, Green himself presided in a major initiation ceremony. About 700 members joined in a single day.

Meanwhile, Green led the Klan in renewing its political activities. He was active in the 1948 Georgia gubernatorial special election, reportedly serving as an aide-de-camp to candidate Herman Talmadge. Talmadge was seen as the Klan's candidate for the office. When he did win the election, the Klan took credit for it. According to Stetson Kennedy, Talmadge had promised the Klan "a free hand in any racial rioting".

He was elected Imperial Wizard two weeks before his death from a heart attack in Atlanta, Georgia on August 18, 1949. He died in the rose garden of his home. His death weakened the Klan by further splintering its leadership. He was replaced by Samuel Roper.

== 1949 Exhibition Baseball Games ==
After the Brooklyn Dodgers announced in January that their exhibition games would be in Macon and Atlanta, Green stated "there is no law against the game. But we have an unwritten law in the South – the Jim Crow law." His statements were against the black players on the team. During the exhibition games, Green used the influence of Herman Talmadge to try and ban Dodgers players Jackie Robinson and Roy Campanella.

== Organizations ==
During his command, the Ku Klux Klan infiltrated and controlled the Georgia Bureau of Investigation. Green's successor Samuel Roper was the second director of the Georgia Bureau of Investigation. Green also made alliances with the Atlanta Police Department and Atlanta taxi drivers.

== Sources ==
- Quarles, Chester L. (1999), The Ku Klux Klan and Related American Racialist and Antisemitic Organizations: A History and Analysis, McFarland, ISBN 978-0786406470

| Preceded by James A. Colescott | Imperial Wizard of the Ku Klux Klan; 1946–1949 | Succeeded by Samuel Roper |
