= Robert Shelton (Ku Klux Klan) =

American Ku Klux Klan member (1929–2003)

Robert M. Shelton
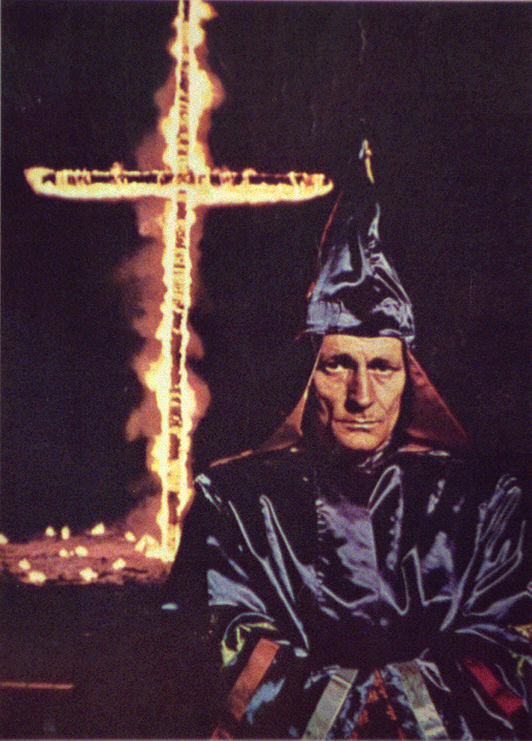
- Shelton at a Klan ceremony in 1969

1st Grand Wizard of the United Klans of America Inc.
- In office 1961–1987
- Preceded by: Position established
- Succeeded by: Position abolished

Personal details
- Born: Robert Marvin Shelton; June 12, 1929 Tuscaloosa, Alabama, U.S.
- Died: March 17, 2003 (aged 73) Tuscaloosa, Alabama, U.S.
- Occupation: Factory worker, car-tire salesman, printer
- Known for: Imperial Wizard of United Klans of America

Robert Marvin Shelton (June 12, 1929 – March 17, 2003) was an American salesman and printer who became notorious for being the Imperial Wizard of the United Klans of America (UKA), a Ku Klux Klan group, active from the early 1960s until 1987.

== Early life ==
Shelton was born June 12, 1929 in Alberta City, Tuscaloosa. As a young man, he worked in his parents' store, before enlisting in the United States Air Force during the Korean War as a pilot. He was discharged September 9, 1951.

== Career and KKK activities ==
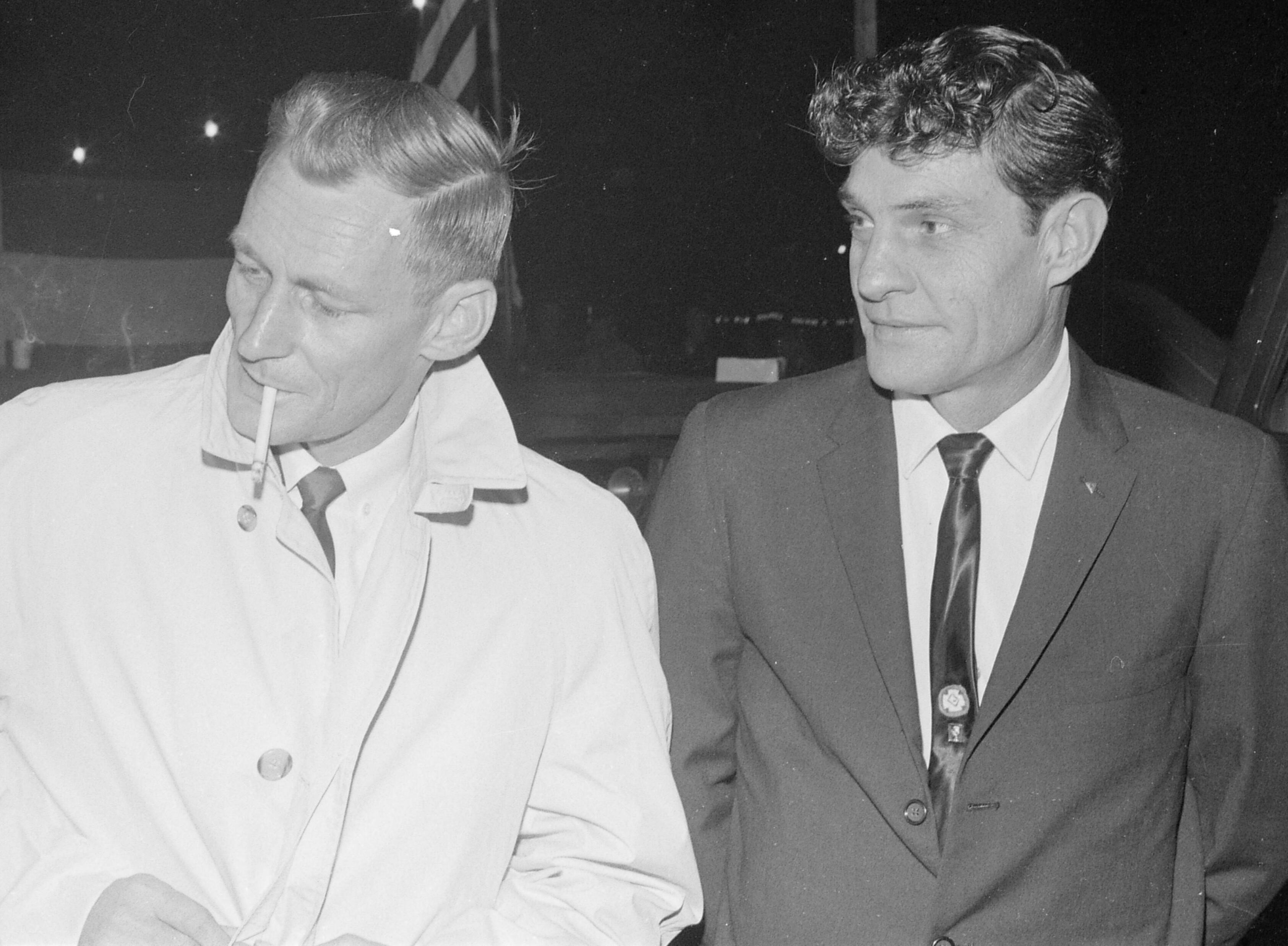
Shelton (left), at the time the Imperial Wizard of the United Klans of America, with King Kleagle of Mississippi and secret FBI informant Ernest Gilbert, 1965

Shelton was a factory worker and a car-tire salesman. He also owned a printing business, with an office on Union Boulevard. In the late 1960s, Shelton ran for Police Commissioner in Tuscaloosa, Alabama. He finished in fifth place.

Following the death of Imperial Wizard Eldon Edwards, the original KKK organization began to fracture during the leadership of Imperial Wizard Roy Davis during the 1960s. Shelton started a new KKK organization, the United Klans of America in an effort to unite the various KKK factions, and served as the UKA leader starting in 1961, which peaked with an estimated 30,000 members. By 1965, Shelton's organization had outgrown the other KKK factions to become the largest in the United States, according to the FBI. In 1966, Shelton was sentenced to one year in prison and fined $1,000 for contempt of the United States Congress, "for refusing to turn over membership lists to the House Committee on Un-American Activities." In 1969, after losing his appeals, he reported to prison to serve his sentence.

In 1984, James Knowles, a UKA member of the UKA's Klavern 900 in Mobile, was convicted of the 1981 murder of Michael Donald. At trial, Knowles said he and Henry Hays killed Donald "in order to show Klan strength in Alabama." In 1987, the Southern Poverty Law Center brought a civil case, on behalf of the victim's family, against the United Klans of America for being responsible in the lynching of Donald, a 19-year-old black man. Unable to come up with the $7 million awarded by a jury, the UKA was forced to turn over its national headquarters to Donald's mother, who then sold it. During the civil trial Knowles said he was "carrying out the orders" of Bennie Jack Hays, Henry Hays' father and a long-time Shelton lieutenant.

In 1994, Shelton described the Klan as a shadow of what it once was:

"The Klan will never return. Not with the robes and the rallies and the cross lightings and parades, everything that made the Klan the Klan, the mysticism, what we called Klankraft. I’m still a Klansman, always will be. The Klan is my belief, my religion. But it won't work anymore. The Klan is gone. Forever."

== Death ==
Shelton died of a heart attack on March 17, 2003, in Tuscaloosa, Alabama.

| Preceded by Roy Elonzo Davis | Imperial Wizard of the Ku Klux Klan; 1961 – 1987 | Succeeded by none |
