= Samuel Roper (Klansman) =

American Ku Klux Klan member

6th Imperial Wizard of the Knights of the Ku Klux Klan
- In office August 18, 1949 – 1950
- Preceded by: Samuel Green
- Succeeded by: Eldon Edwards

Personal details
- Born: April 10, 1895 Trussville, Alabama, U.S.
- Died: March 1, 1986 (aged 90) Chiefland, Florida, U.S.
- Cause of death: Kidney failure

Samuel W. Roper (April 10, 1895 – March 1, 1986) was an American law enforcement official and Imperial Wizard of the Ku Klux Klan (KKK).

Roper was an Atlanta, Georgia police officer and the second Director of the Georgia Bureau of Investigation. After leaving law enforcement in 1949, Roper succeeded Samuel Green as Imperial Wizard of the KKK, and held that position until 1950. His successor was Eldon Edwards. He has also been directly implicated in the September 12, 1936, lynching and Thomas Finch in Atlanta, Georgia.

Roper moved to Florida in 1972 and was a resident of Chiefland, Florida at the time of his death. He died of kidney failure at the Veterans Administration Hospital in Gainesville, Florida on March 1, 1986.

Preceded by Samuel Green	Imperial Wizard of the Ku Klux Klan; 1949 – 1950	Succeeded by Eldon Edwards
