= Bill Wilkinson (white supremacist) =

American Christian Identity pastor and businessman (born 1942)

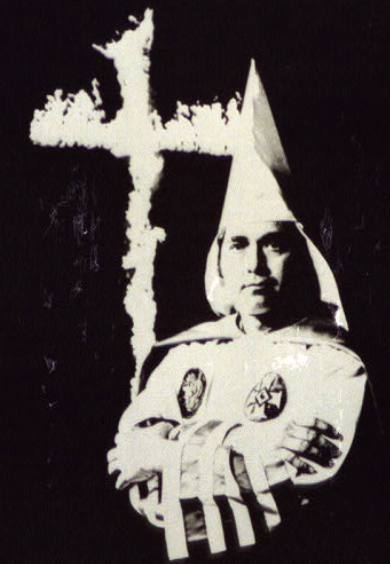
- Depiction of Wilkinson, 1970s

Imperial Wizard of the Ku Klux Klan
- In office 1975–1984

Personal details
- Born: Elbert Claude Wilkinson; 1942 (age 83–84) Louisiana, U.S.
- Occupation: Pastor; social activist; businessman

Bill Wilkinson (born Elbert Claude Wilkinson; 1942) is an American social activist and Christian Identity pastor who served as Imperial Wizard of the Ku Klux Klan from 1975 to 1984, during which time he was accordingly involved in the promotion of white nationalist and segregationist ideologies.

== Background ==
Bill Wilkinson was born in 1942 as Elbert Claude Wilkinson. Having grown up in Denham Springs, Louisiana, he would eventually rise to lead a local chapter of the Ku Klux Klan, ultimately achieving national influence.

== Ku Klux Klan ==
In the 1970s, Wilkinson became affiliated with the Ku Klux Klan, later rising to prominence upon becoming Imperial Wizard of the institution in 1975.

He was said to have followed David Duke's lead in "recruiting youth to the Klan"; nonetheless, he would take this campaign even more seriously, exemplified with the case of his founding of a camp for children in which they would be trained with arms and learn about the qualities of white nationalism. One of the incidents perpetrated by these indoctrinated children occurred in 1979, when a "dozen teenagers" wore Invisible Empire T-shirts, burning a school of advanced age to the ground, all purportedly while the adult Klansmen applauded.

Later that year, Wilkinson, alongside his men, went to Decatur, Alabama, to confront a parade advocating for the acquittal of Tommy Lee Hines, a local black man who was charged with the rape of three white women. This altercation led to the non-fatal shootings of two black attendees, along with two of Wilkinson's own men; his Grand Dragon in Alabama and nine other Klansmen consequently faced indictment for civil rights violations. All of them were eventually convicted at trial or pleaded guilty.

In February 1981, Wilkinson traveled to Windsor Locks, Connecticut, to attend a rally supporting Meriden police officer Gene Hale, who was involved in the fatal shooting of Keith Rakestrau, a 24-year-old black man. The rally aimed to promote "law and order," with some attendees potentially wearing Klan robes, although without plans for a cross-burning. Counter-demonstrations were organized by the NAACP and other groups in response to the Klan's presence.

In 1982, Wilkinson appeared on a CNN Crossfire interview with Tom Braden and Pat Buchanan, in which they debated over matters pertaining to sociology and politics.

In 1984, his title was relinquished, gradually fading from the public spotlight thereafter.

== Later years ==
Sometime in the mid-to-late 1980s, Wilkinson was said to have immigrated to Belize, subsequently establishing a seaside resort of considerable worth there. In 2002, he was mentioned in an article from the Belizean newspaper, San Pedro Sun; the reference reads the following:

Like a true San Pedrano, Bill has lived those years unselfishly and continues to do so day after day, doing his part to provide security and shelter...

As of January 2014, Wilkinson still resides in Belize, and has remained firm in his prejudiced stance regarding race.
