= Leaders of the Ku Klux Klan =

List of Ku Klux Klan leaders and their titles

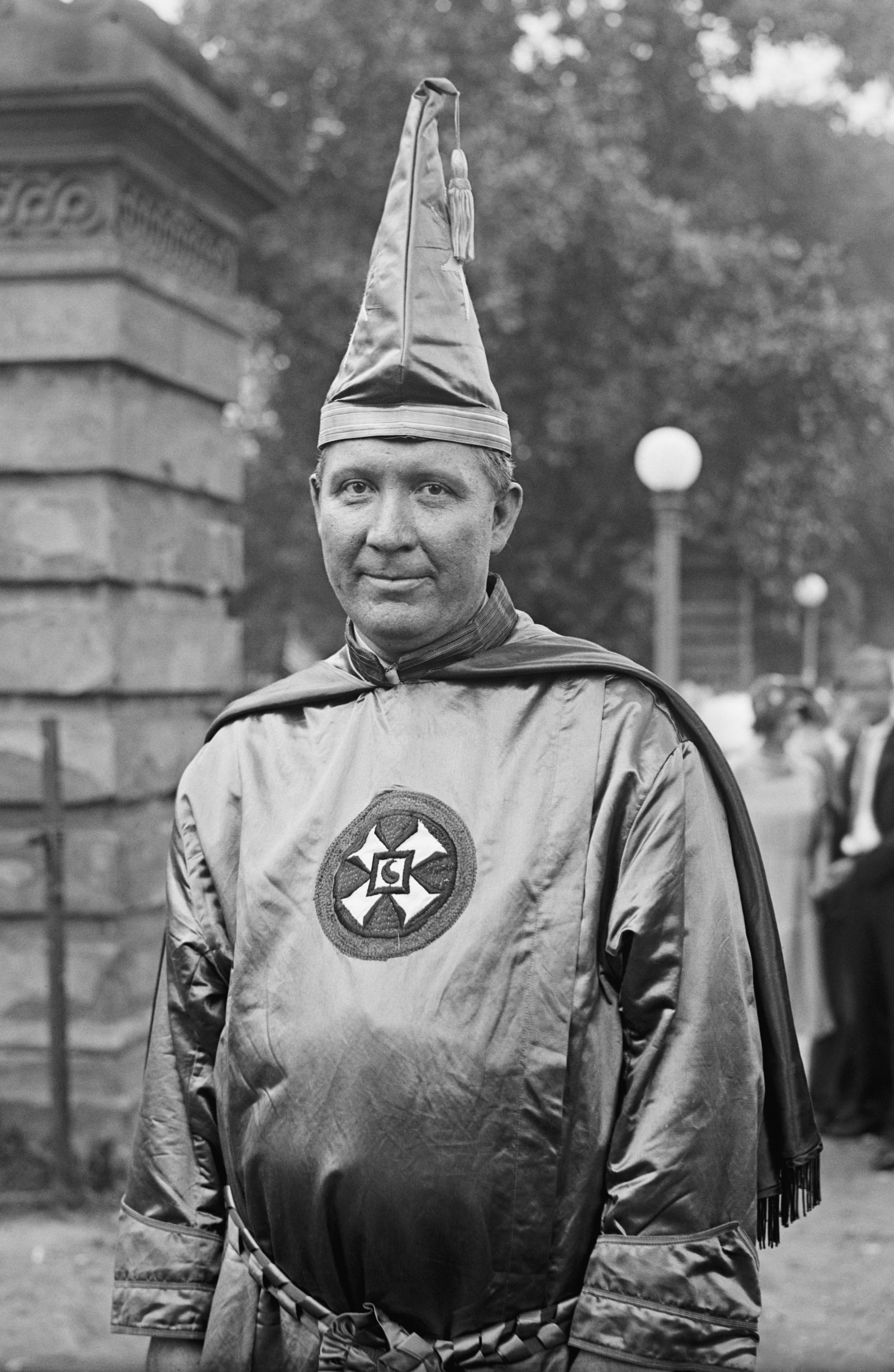
Hiram Wesley Evans, Imperial Wizard from 1923 to 1939

The national leader of the Ku Klux Klan is often called the grand wizard, imperial wizard, or national director; varying depending on the specific Klan organization.

== Titles ==
The title "Grand Wizard" was used by the first Klan, founded in 1865 and active during the Reconstruction era until 1872. The title was chosen because its first and only officeholder, former Confederate general Nathan Bedford Forrest, had been known as "The Wizard of the Saddle" during the Civil War.

The second Klan, founded in 1915, styled their national leader the "Imperial Wizard". National officers were styled "Imperial" officers. State or "Realm" officers were styled "Grand" officers. For example, a "Grand Dragon" was the highest-ranking Klansman in a given state.

== First Klan (1865–1872) ==
The Ku Klux Klan was founded by six Confederate veterans in 1865, but did not elect a grand wizard until after Nathan Bedford Forrest joined in 1867.

- Nathan Bedford Forrest, Grand Wizard, 1867–1869. Forrest resigned in 1869 and ordered the Ku Klux Klan to be dissolved, although the group remained active until 1872

== Second Klan (1915–1944) ==
- William Joseph Simmons (1880–1945) was the imperial wizard (national leader) of the second Ku Klux Klan between 1915 and 1922.
- Hiram Wesley Evans (1881–1966), part of a group that ousted William Joseph Simmons from the position of Imperial Wizard in November 1922. Evans was Imperial Wizard from 1922 to 1939, during which time the Klan's membership peaked.
- James A. Colescott (1897–1950), Imperial Wizard, 1939–1944. Colescott dissolved the organization after the IRS filed a lien for $685,305 in unpaid taxes, penalties, and interest from the 1920s against the Klan.

== Later "Third" Klans (1940s–present) ==
- Samuel Green (1889–1949). Green reformed the KKK in 1946. He was briefly Imperial Wizard of a reorganized Klan in 1949, but died of a heart attack within two weeks of his election.
- Jeff Lynn Berry (1968–2013)
- Samuel Bowers (1924–2006)
- David Duke (born 1950), Imperial Wizard, Knights of the Ku Klux Klan (1974–1981); Duke started a new branch of the KKK.
- Virgil Lee Griffin (1944–2009)
- Thomas Robb (born 1946), National Director, Knights of the Ku Klux Klan, 1989–present
- David Wayne Hull (born 1962), Imperial Wizard, White Knights of the Ku Klux Klan, until 2003
- Johnny Lee Clary (1959–2014), Imperial Wizard in 1989 of the White Knights Organization but subsequently renounced his membership and became an ordained Christian minister speaking against racism and movements such as the Ku Klux Klan.
- Ron Edwards, Imperial Wizard of the Imperial Klans of America.
- Robert Shelton (1930–2003), Grand Wizard, United Klans of America Inc., 1961–1987, Shelton started a new branch of the KKK
- Louis Beam (born 1946), Grand Wizard, Texas Ku Klux Klan, 1984–2000
- Bill Wilkinson (born 1942), Imperial Wizard, Invisible Empire Knights of the Ku Klux Klan, 1975–1981, Wilkinson formed a competing branch which, at the time, was the largest national KKK organization.
- Don Black (born 1953), formerly imprisoned white nationalist and Imperial Wizard, from 1981 to 1987.
- Eldon Edwards (1909–1960), Imperial Wizard, Original Knights of the Ku Klux Klan, 1950–1959
- Roy Elonza Davis (1890–1967), Second in command of 1915 KKK under William Simmons, Grand Dragon of Texas under Eldon Edwards. Imperial Wizard, Original Knights of the Ku Klux Klan, Knights of the Flaming Sword 1959–1964; Both organizations disbanded.
- Samuel Roper (1895–1986), law enforcement officer turned Imperial Wizard of the KKK, from 1949 to 1950. Styled Imperial Wizard, Original Knights of the Ku Klux Klan 1949–1950, He was preceded by Samuel Green, and was later succeeded by Eldon Lee Edwards.
- Bob Jones (1930–1989), Grand Dragon of the United Klans of America in North Carolina from 1963 to 1967.
- Tom Metzger (1938–2020), Grand Wizard of the KKK in the 1970s. Founder of the White Aryan Resistance (WAR).

== See also ==
- Ku Klux Klan titles and vocabulary
- Ernie Roth, billed as "The Grand Wizard of Wrestling"
