= William Joseph Simmons =

Imperial Wizard of the Ku Klux Klan (1880–1945)

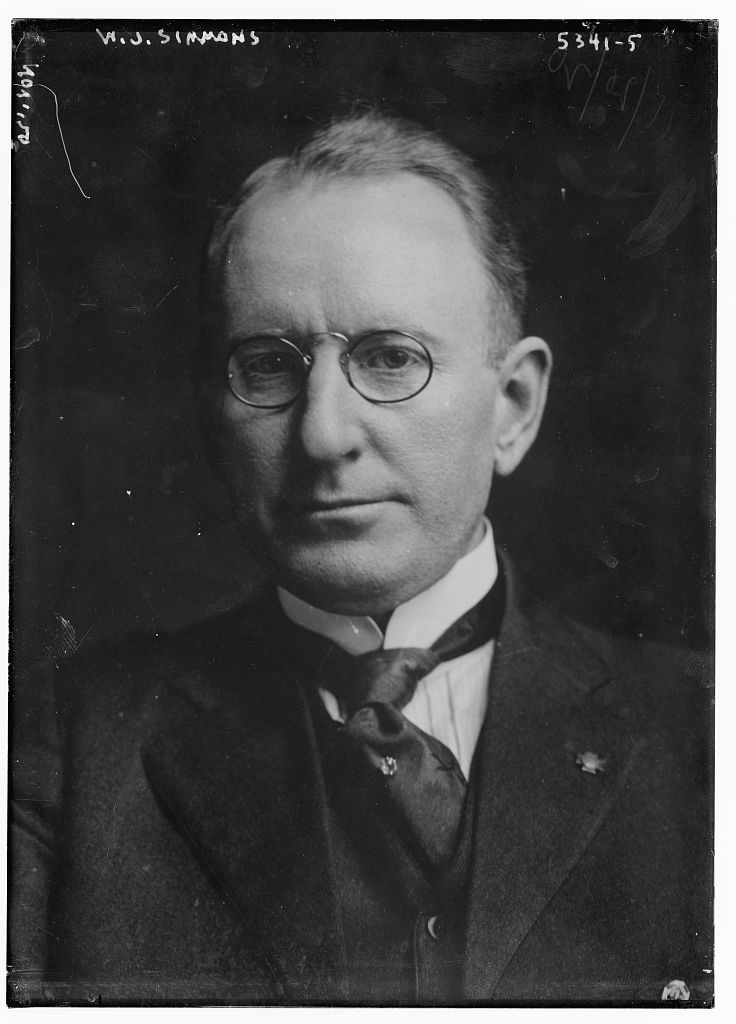

2nd Imperial Wizard of the Knights of the Ku Klux Klan
- In office November 25, 1915 – 1923
- Succeeded by: Hiram Wesley Evans

Personal details
- Born: May 7, 1880 Harpersville, Alabama
- Died: May 18, 1945 (aged 65) Atlanta, Georgia

William Joseph Simmons (May 7, 1880 – May 18, 1945) was an American preacher and fraternal organizer who founded and led the second Ku Klux Klan from Thanksgiving evening 1915 until being ousted in 1922 by Hiram Wesley Evans.

== Early life ==
Simmons was born in Harpersville, Alabama, to Calvin Henry Simmons, a physician, and his wife Lavonia Simmons née Davis, daughter of Thomas C. Davis. In his younger years, he attempted to study medicine at Johns Hopkins University, but unable to afford it, opted to serve in the Spanish–American War instead. After receiving an honorable discharge, he became a teacher for the Methodist Episcopal Church, South, but was suspended by the church in 1912 for inefficiency.

Simmons later joined two churches and twelve different fraternal organizations, which flourished in the early twentieth century. He was known as "Joe", "Doc" (in reference to his medical training) or "Colonel" (referring to his rank in the Woodmen of the World).

== Ku Klux Klan ==
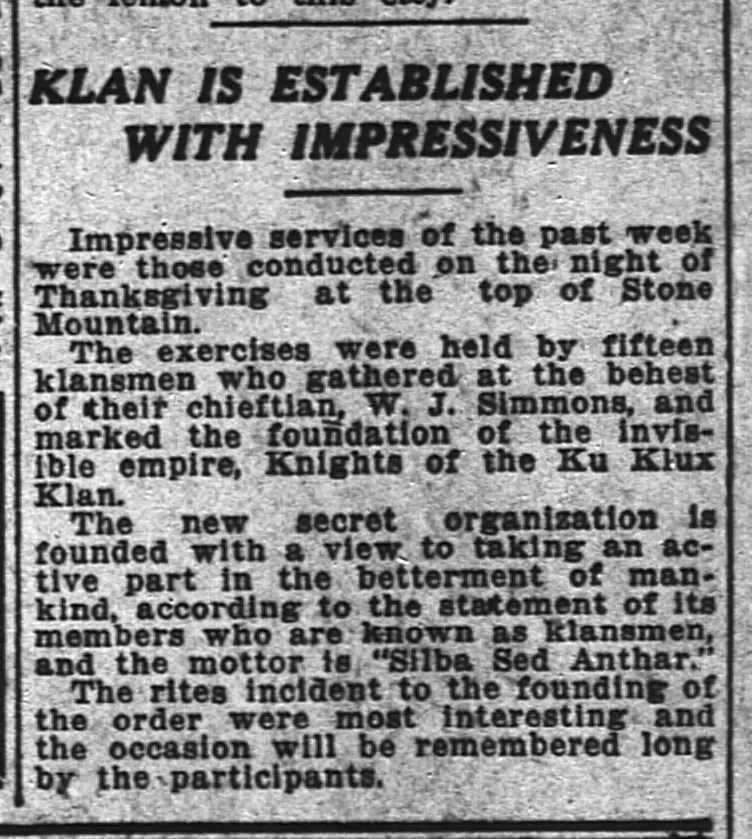
The Atlanta Constitution clipping Nov. 28, 1915, describing the Klan re-establishment atop Stone Mountain

While recovering in 1915 after being hit by a car, Simmons decided to rebuild the Klan which he had seen depicted in the newly released film The Birth of a Nation directed by D. W. Griffith. He obtained a copy of the Reconstruction Klan's "Prescript" and used it to write his own prospectus for a reincarnation of the organization.

As the nucleus of his revived Klan, Simmons organized a group of friends, in addition to two elderly men who had been members of the original Klan. On Thanksgiving eve, November 25, 1915, they climbed Stone Mountain to burn a cross and inaugurate the new group, with fifteen charter members. Simmons's later account of the founding included a dramatic story of "a temperature far below freezing", although weather records showed that the temperature had never fallen below 45 °F (7 °C) that night on Stone Mountain. He declared himself the Imperial Wizard of the Invisible Empire of the Knights of the Ku Klux Klan.

The imagery of the burning cross, which had not been used by the original Klan, had been introduced by Griffith in Birth of a Nation. The film had derived the image from the works of Thomas Dixon, Jr., upon which the film was based. Dixon had been inspired by the historical practices of Scottish clans, who had burned crosses as a method of signaling from one hilltop to the next. The image also occurs in Lady of the Lake (1810), a long poem by Walter Scott. The signature white robes of this new Klan also likely come from Dixon via Birth of a Nation.

In the first years of the new Klan, a few thousand members enrolled, although many more later pledged allegiance, particularly in industrial cities of the Midwest. Initially portraying itself as another fraternal organization, the group was opposed to the new immigrants from southern and eastern Europe—who were mostly Jews and Roman Catholics—and anybody else who was not a native-born Anglo-Saxon or Celtic Protestant.

While leading the Klan, Simmons was a "professor of southern history" at the short-lived Lanier University in Atlanta.

Simmons toured with Roy Elonzo Davis during the 1920s during klan rallies; Davis claimed to be second in command of the Klan under Simmons. After Simmons was ousted as KKK leader by Hiram W. Evans in 1923, he and Davis worked together to start a new white supremacist organization called Knights of the Flaming Sword, where Simmons resumed his role as Imperial Wizard. Davis, as a high ranking Klan leader, played a key role in encouraging members to abandon Evans and remain loyal to Simmons in their new order. Traveling across the south, Davis successfully retained the loyalty of at least 60,000 Klan recruits and had secured over $150,000 ($2.3 million in 2021 dollars)

== Later life and death ==
When the New York World exposed violent affairs conducted by the Ku Klux Klan, Simmons was called to testify in front of the U.S. House Committee on Rules. Hearings began in October 1921 and lasted for over a week. Simmons distanced himself from the events and stressed the Klan's fraternal nature. Congressional hearings ended with no direct consequences for the Klan, although Simmons lost his influence.

Having increased his own network of influence, Hiram Wesley Evans succeeded Simmons in the position of the Imperial Wizard in November 1922. Simmons was at the same time elected Emperor for life. The Klan started to decline after a peak of membership and influence in 1925, particularly because of the scandal in which D. C. Stephenson, one of its top leaders, was convicted of raping, kidnapping and murdering Madge Oberholtzer.

Simmons died in Atlanta on May 18, 1945.

== Publications ==
- The Ku Klux Klan (1917)
- ABC of the Invisible Empire, Knights of the Ku Klux Klan (1920)
- The Klan Unmasked Atlanta, Ga., Wm. E. Thompson Pub. Co. 1923
- America's menace; Or, The Enemy Within (An Epitome) (1926)
- The Ku Klux Klan: Yesterday, Today and Forever (1930s)

Preceded by Nathan Bedford Forrest (1869; as Grand Wizard)	Imperial Wizard of the Ku Klux Klan; 1915–1922	Succeeded by Hiram Wesley Evans
