= James A. Colescott =

American Ku Klux Klan member

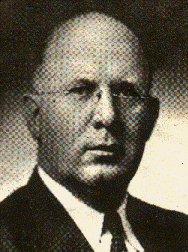
- Colescott c. 1940

4th Imperial Wizard of the Knights of the Ku Klux Klan
- In office June 10, 1939 – April 23, 1944
- Preceded by: Hiram Wesley Evans
- Succeeded by: Samuel Green

Personal details
- Born: James Arnold Colescott; January 11, 1897 Terre Haute, Indiana, United States
- Died: January 11, 1950 (aged 53) Coral Gables, Florida, United States
- Spouse: Louise
- Occupation: Veterinarian

James Arnold Colescott (January 11, 1897 – January 11, 1950) was an American white supremacist who was Imperial Wizard of the Knights of the Ku Klux Klan. Under financial pressure from the Internal Revenue Service (IRS) for back taxes, he disbanded the second wave of the original Ku Klux Klan in 1944.

== Biography ==
He was born in Terre Haute, Indiana, to Frank Colescott and Minnie Minnie Olive Acuff on January 11, 1897. He graduated from the veterinary college in Terre Haute and worked as a veterinarian. He joined the local Ku Klux Klan chapter in Vigo County, Indiana, and in sixteen years moved through the ranks up to the Imperial Wizard. Colescott died on January 11, 1950, his 53rd birthday, in U.S. Veterans' Hospital in Coral Gables, Florida.

== Imperial Wizard ==
Imperial Wizard Hiram Wesley Evans resigned on June 10, 1939, and Colescott became the Ku Klux Klan's new leader. He had previously served as chief of staff under Evans. Hiram Evans was effectively forced to quit, as his renunciation of Anti-Catholicism had proven unpopular with "rank-and-file Klansmen". He resigned in favor of Colescott, who was soon officially initiated as the Imperial Wizard. The initiation ceremony was held in the Dixie Ball Room of the Henry Grady Hotel in Atlanta, Georgia. There were rumors that Evans sold control of the Klan to Colescott in a regular buyout. The alleged transaction of $220,000 between the two men remains unconfirmed. Colescott and Samuel Green did however purchase the ownership of the Klan's headquarters in Atlanta, which they renamed to the Imperial Palace.

=== Pre-war reorganization efforts ===
In his new role, Colescott had "initiated several property sales" to raise money for the Klan. He personally led efforts to reorganize the Klan, and toured the Northern United States, the Midwestern United States, and the state of Florida in attempts to appeal to a wider audience. Chester L. Quarles, a professor of criminal justice at the University of Mississippi, points that Colescott had considerable experience as a Klan recruiter across several states. He views Colescott as having good organizational skills, but leaving much to be desired as a public speaker. Some Klan leaders employed glad-handing as a strategy, but Colescott was not among them. His tours were met with suspicion and hostility in the Midwestern United States, including his native Indiana. In the 1920s, the Klan in this region was led by D. C. Stephenson, whose term ended with a major scandal and his conviction for murder. This and other cases of "Klan corruption" had left the organization with a decidedly negative reputation among Mid-westerners.

Overall, Colescott was unable to stop the exodus of members due to the Great Depression. Lowering the initiation fee from $10 to $6 and providing cheaper robes for new recruits for $3.50 instead of $6.50 did not yield much results.

=== World War II ===
The decline continued during World War II, when most of the Americans began being preoccupied with the issues of national security and Ku Klux Klan "lost social influence, money and political support". The Klan's association with Nazi sympathizer organizations, such as the German American Bund, and with the Detroit race riot of 1943 were detrimental to the organization's public image: a substantial number of Klansmen stopped attending meetings and paying their dues.

Since the late 1930s, there were recurring reports of Klansmen involved in floggings, kidnappings, and murders. The incidents seemed to be sporadic rather than part of a systematic campaign. Trying to build a positive public perception of the Klan, Colescott announced to the press that he was "against flogging, lynchings, or intimidations", and also had pro-Bund Arthur Hornbui Bell and Alton Milford Young removed from positions at the New Jersey organization.

==== Dies Committee hearing ====
In January 1942, Colescott was questioned by the Dies Committee, precursor to the House Un-American Activities Committee, headed by Martin Dies Jr. (D-TX). Colescott was criticized by Dies for the Klan's alleged anti-Catholicism. During the hearing, committee members John E. Rankin (D-MS) and Joe Starnes (D-AL) defended Ku Klux Klan as an "American institution". The Dies Committee questioned Colescott about the connection of the Klan to violence. He claimed that terrorism was actually against the principles of the Klan, and that the so-called or alleged Klansmen behind these acts were former members, extremists, which the Klan had purged from its ranks. He also testified to the Committee concerning the then-current status of the Klan in terms of membership and finances. There were reportedly less than 10,000 registered members of the Klan. In the financial year 1941, the Klan had only collected $10,000 from initiation fees and other dues.

=== Legal troubles ===
In April 1944, the IRS filed a lien for $685,305 in unpaid taxes, penalties and interest from 1920s against the Klan. The special Klonvocation convened by Colescott decided to dissolve the organization. Before formally stepping down on April 23, 1944, he founded a provisional governing committee consisted of five members. On April 23, the final Klonvocation gathering was held in Atlanta. Its decisions disbanded the central Klan organization, "repealed all degrees, vacated all offices, voided all charters, and relieved every Klansman of any obligation whatever". Local chapters could, however, continue their activities, now acting independently from each other. The final Klonvocation called for them to act in an "informal, unincorporated alliance".

=== After disbanding ===
Most of the local chapters in the South, or klaverns, continued to operate, thus staging the Klan's comeback and third re-organization under the leadership of Samuel Green, an Atlanta obstetrician, in 1946. Already in November 1944, anthropologist H. Scudder Mekeel had expressed concerns that the end of World War II could be followed by a "revival in full force" of the Klan. Meanwhile, Colescott retired to Miami. He remained bitter about his forced retirement, and blamed "nigger-lover" Franklin D. Roosevelt and "that Jew" Henry Morgenthau Jr. for the downfall of the Klan. In his final statement, Colescott declared,

We had to sell out our asserts, turn the proceeds over to the government, and go out of business. Maybe the government can make something of the Klan – I never could.

== Sources ==
- Quarles, Chester L. (1999). The Ku Klux Klan and Related American Racialist and Antisemitic Organizations: A History and Analysis. Jefferson, N.C.: McFarland & Company. ISBN 978-0786406470.

Preceded by Hiram Wesley Evans	Imperial Wizard of the Ku Klux Klan; 1939–1944	Succeeded by Samuel Green
