= Hiram Wesley Evans =

Ku Klux Klan Imperial Wizard (1881–1966)

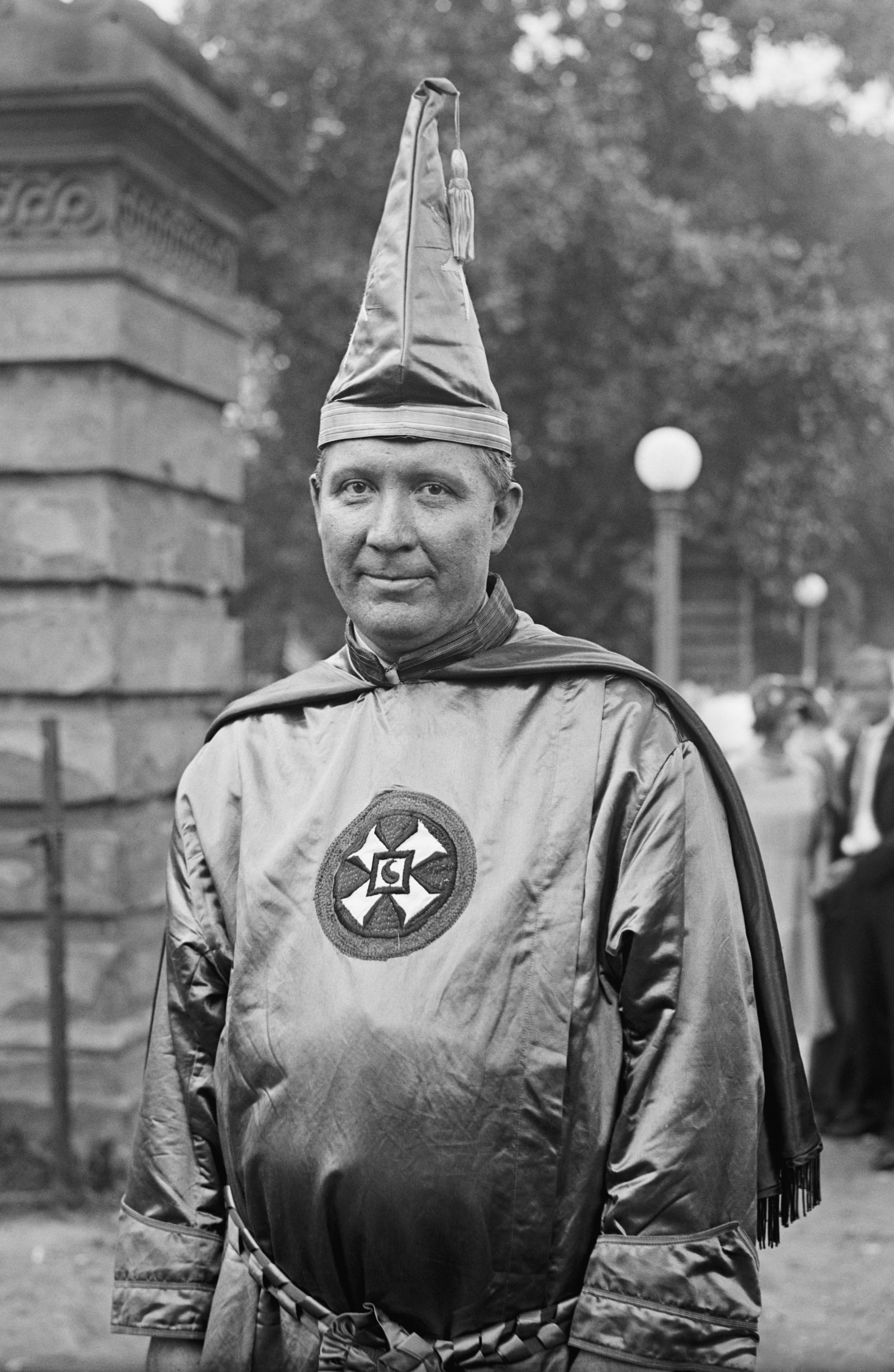
- Evans in Washington, D.C., 1925
- Born: September 26, 1881; Ashland, Alabama, U.S.
- Died: September 14, 1966 (aged 84); Atlanta, Georgia, U.S.
- Education: Vanderbilt University
- Occupation: Dentist
- Employer: Ku Klux Klan
- Political party: Democratic

3rd Imperial Wizard of the Knights of the Ku Klux Klan
- In office 1923 – June 10, 1939
- Preceded by: William Joseph Simmons
- Succeeded by: James Arnold Colescott

Hiram Wesley Evans (September 26, 1881 – September 14, 1966) was an American white supremacist who was Imperial Wizard of the Ku Klux Klan, a white supremacist hate group, from 1923 until his resignation in 1939. Trained as a dentist, Evans left that profession to pursue Klan leadership, ultimately becoming the organization's most influential figure during its peak period of national growth in the 1920s.

A native of Alabama, Evans attended Vanderbilt University studying dentistry. He operated a small, moderately successful practice in Texas until 1920, when he joined the Klan's Dallas chapter. He quickly rose through the ranks and was part of a group that ousted William Joseph Simmons from the position of Imperial Wizard, the national leader, in November 1922. Evans succeeded him and sought to transform the group into a political power.

Evans had led the kidnapping and torture of a black man while leader of the Dallas Klan, but as Imperial Wizard, he publicly discouraged vigilante actions for fear that they would hinder his attempts to gain political influence. In 1923, Evans presided over the largest Klan gathering in history, attended by over 200,000, and endorsed several successful candidates in 1924 elections. He moved the Klan's headquarters from Atlanta to Washington, D.C., and organized a march of 30,000 members, the largest march in the organization's history, on Pennsylvania Avenue. Evans's efforts notwithstanding, the Klan was buffeted by damaging publicity in the early 1920s, partially because of leadership struggles between Evans and his rivals, which hindered his political efforts.

In the 1930s, the Great Depression significantly decreased the Klan's income, prompting Evans to work for a construction company to supplement his pay. He resigned his position with the Klan in 1939, after disavowing anti-Catholicism. He was succeeded by his chief of staff, James A. Colescott. The next year, Evans faced accusations of involvement in a government corruption scandal in Georgia; he was fined $15,000 after legal proceedings.

Evans sought to promote a form of nativist, Protestant nationalism. In addition to his white supremacist ideology, he fiercely condemned Catholicism, trade unionism, and communism, which he associated with recent immigrants from Eastern and Southern Europe. He argued that Jews formed a non-American culture and resisted assimilation although he denied being an anti-Semite. Historians credit Evans with refocusing the Klan on political activities and recruiting outside the South; the Klan grew most in the Midwest and industrial cities but this political influence and membership gains he sought were transitory.

== Early life and education ==
Evans was born in Ashland, Alabama, on September 26, 1881, and moved to Hubbard, Texas, with his family as a child. The son of Hiram Martin Evans, a judge, and his wife, Georgia Evans, the younger Evans graduated from Vanderbilt University. Shortly after, he became a dentist, receiving his license in 1900. He married Ellen "Bama" Hill in 1923; they had three children together.

Evans established a small, moderately successful dentistry practice in Downtown Dallas that provided inexpensive services. Rumors later arose that his dental qualifications were "a bit shady." A Protestant, Evans attended a church belonging to the Disciples of Christ denomination. He was also a Freemason. Evans described himself as "the most average man in America." Of average height and somewhat overweight, Evans was well dressed, a skilled speaker, and very ambitious.

== Initial Klan activities ==
Conceived by its founders as a continuation of the Reconstruction-era Klan (controversially linked to General Nathan Bedford Forrest), the revived Ku Klux Klan had been established in Atlanta in 1915. Leading up to his involvement in the Klan, Evans had a significant personal involvement in Freemasonry. He was initially raised in Dallas Lodge No. 760 in July 1907 under the Grand Lodge of Texas. Evans was involved in both York Rite (including the Masonic "Knights Templar") and Scottish Rite freemasonry. Evans was raised to the Thirty-Second Degree at the Dallas Consistory in April 1913. He was also a member of the Shriners, having joined the Hella Temple at Dallas in April 1911. Within the York Rite, Evans was a Past Master of Pentagon Lodge No. 1080 in Dallas. Bertram G. Christie, the founder of the Dallas Klan in 1920, was also a mason and met with Evans and a few of his fellow masons belonging to the Pentagon Lodge in March 1921, such as George K. Butcher.

The following month, Evans was involved in his first Klan vigilante activity when he took part in the flogging and branding of Alex Johnson on April 1, 1921. According to a contemporary report in the Denton Record-Chronicle, Johnson was a "Negro bus boy" who was being investigated by the police after he had been discovered in the room of a white woman guest at the hotel.

Evans left his dental practice so that he could dedicate all his time to the group. In 1921, he was elected as "exalted cyclops", a recruiting position sometimes referred to as kleagle, in the Dallas Klan No. 66. When he was elected, the Dallas Klan had recently received a "self-ruling charter" from the Atlanta-based leadership and was the group's largest chapter. The same year, Evans was appointed to the position of "great titan" (executive) of the "Realm of Texas" and proceeded to lead a successful membership drive for the state's Klan.

Evans initially supported violence against minorities, remembering a lynching he witnessed as a child. With the Texas Klan, he sought to create "black squads" to attack minorities. He joined several Klan members in kidnapping and torturing a black bellhop and etching the letters KKK into his forehead with acid, ostensibly because they suspected he was involved in pandering prostitutes. Atlanta-based leaders pressured Evans to curb racial violence in Dallas; around then, the Texas Klan had received significant negative publicity after castrating an African-American doctor. Although Evans was not morally opposed to violence against minorities, he publicly condemned vigilante activity because he feared that it would attract government scrutiny and hinder potential Klan-backed political campaigning. The change of stance led the leader of the Houston Klan to accuse him of hypocrisy. Although Evans later took credit for a decrease in lynchings in the Southern United States during the 1920s, several Klan members claimed that he surreptitiously encouraged and presided over acts of violence against minorities.

In 1921, Evans was assigned to oversee the Klan's national membership drive at the behest of their publicists, Elizabeth Tyler and Edward Young Clarke. In 1922, the group's leadership made Evans the "Imperial kligrapp", a role similar to national secretary, in which capacity he oversaw operations in 13 states. He received a base salary of $7,500 and traveled throughout the country, regularly meeting with local Klan leaders.

== Early national leadership ==
In 1922, Evans joined a group of Klan activists, including Tyler, Clarke, and D. C. Stephenson, in a "coup" against William Joseph Simmons, the group's leader. They deceived Simmons into agreeing to a reorganization of the Klan that removed his practical control; Simmons said that they had claimed that if he remained the Imperial Wizard of the Klan, discord would hamper the organization. Evans gained power and was formally ensconced as Imperial Wizard of the Klan at a 1923 "Klonvokation" in Atlanta, Georgia. Although a legal battle between Evans and Simmons ensued, during which time Simmons was the Klan's titular "emperor," Evans retained control of the Klan. He initially said that he had been unaware of a pending coup until after he was selected. However, by the end of their feud, he described Simmons as the "leader of Bolshevik Klansmen betraying the movement" and later expelled the former leader.

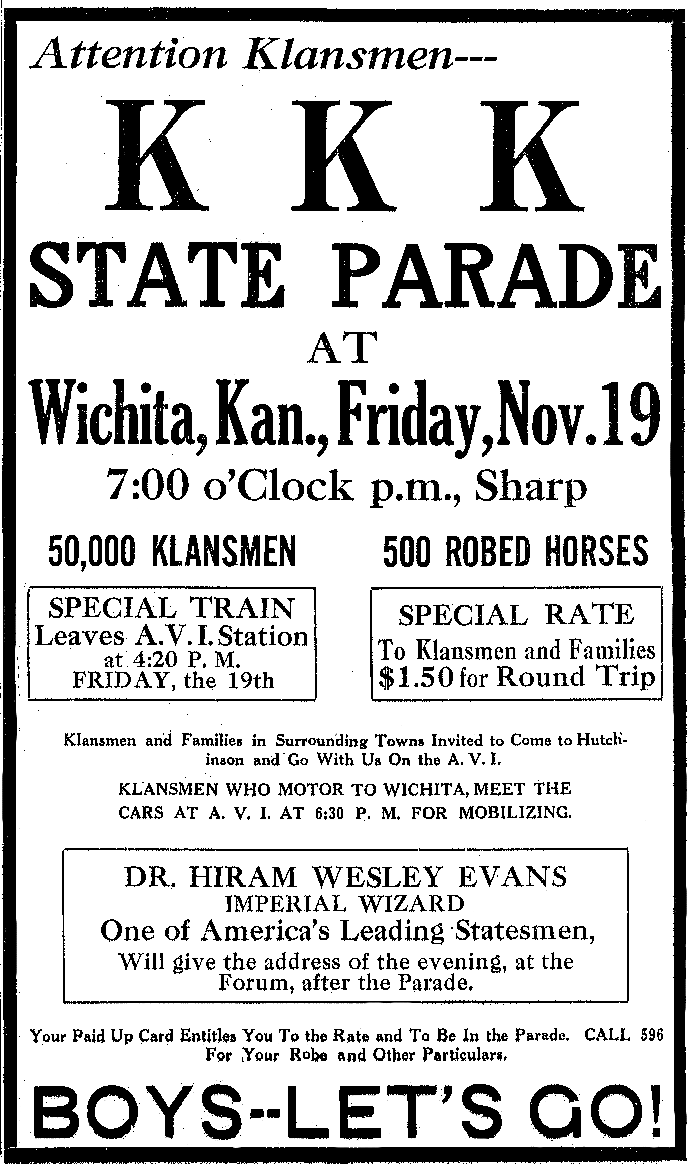
Advertisement for a KKK rally to be held on November 19, 1926, in Wichita, Kansas, at which Evans would speak

As the leader of the Klan, Evans advanced a form of nativist, white supremacy that cast Protestantism as a fundamental part of American patriotism. To Evans, whiteness and Protestantism were equally valued and sometimes conflated: he said the Klan supported the "uncontaminated growth of Anglo-Saxon civilization". He maintained the belief that white Protestants had the exclusive right to govern the US because they were the descendants of the early colonists, whom he described as fleeing Europe for the US to escape its societal bounds. He admitted that many Klan members were of rural, uneducated backgrounds but argued that power should be given to "the common people of America." In a pamphlet entitled Ideals of the Ku Klux Klan, Evans described the Klan as follows:

1. This is a white man's organization.
2. This is a gentile organization.
3. It is an American organization.
4. It is a Protestant organization.

Under Evans, the Klan supported a mixture of right-wing and left-wing political positions, which were described by Thomas Pegram of Loyola University Maryland as "too much of a patchwork to be considered an ideological system." Klan literature spoke highly of politicians such as Woodrow Wilson, William Jennings Bryan, and Grover Cleveland. Evans borrowed numerous concepts from the writings of Lothrop Stoddard and Madison Grant, American writers of the period who promoted eugenics and scientific racism, and he attempted to cast his platforms as if they were based on science. Evans attacked immigrants by arguing that they would promote ideologies such as anarchism and communism, were threats to national unity, and were involved with bootlegging during Prohibition. He considered immigrants "ignorant, superstitious, religious devotees" intent on earning money in the US before retiring to their homelands. However, he supported immigration of whom he deemed "Nordic."

Evans also argued against miscegenation, and Catholic and Jewish immigration on the grounds that they were threats to genetic "good stock," a racial division that was widely supported among white Americans. Evans believed the Catholic Church sought to take control of the US government; he also questioned American Catholics' loyalty to their country, writing that they were subject to their priests, and, as such, to the entire Roman Catholic hierarchy and the Pope. In other writings, he expressed fears that the Catholic Church, in alliance with Jews and non-white Protestant groups, was becoming increasingly active in politics and thus blurring the separation of church and state.

Under Evans's leadership, the Klan became active in Indiana and Illinois, rather than focusing on the Southeast, as it had done in the past. It also grew in Michigan, where 40,000 members, more than half its total, lived in Detroit. It became characterized as an organization prominent in urban areas of the Midwest, where it attracted native-born Americans competing for industrial jobs with recent immigrants. It also attracted members in Nebraska, Colorado, Oregon and Washington.

Evans appointed Stephenson, his early collaborator, as kleagle and Grand Dragon of Indiana. The relationship between the two leaders quickly became acrimonious; Stephenson clashed with Evans over the distribution of membership fees and became embittered after Evans refused to help fund the purchase of a school in Indiana. Although Stephenson believed Evans had deliberately thwarted his attempt to purchase the school to limit his power, Evans unexpectedly promoted Stephenson to Grand Dragon of the "northern realm" in July 1923.

Historian Leonard Joseph Moore of McGill University contends that Evans paid particular attention to the Indiana Klan out of financial self-interest since it was the largest state branch.

The political scientist Arnold S. Rice writes that Evans also worked on a series of changes, advertised as reforms, to the Klan structure and sought to promote a positive public opinion of the Klan; Evans felt that his organization should be able to reach out to those who were "struggling with the moral decay and economic distress of the 20th century." He increased the Klan's surveillance of members before and after initiation, expelling those considered to be of "questionable morals." He also worked to increase Klan involvement in local policing and denounced acts of violence committed by Klan members, promoting the Klan as a symbol of lawfulness. Those efforts, although successful in reducing the number of attacks, were ultimately unable to sway public opinion in the Klan's favor.

== Internal conflicts ==
Evans became embroiled in several internal Klan conflicts that gained media exposure. In January 1921, he and a group of grand dragons expelled the publicist Clarke, who had been critical of Evans's efforts to involve the Klan in electoral politics. Evans also clashed with Henry Grady, a judge from North Carolina who was a member of the Klan from 1922 to 1927, reaching the rank of Grand Dragon. Before Evans gained control of the Klan, Grady had been considered a potential successor to Simmons. After Grady dismissed a Klan-backed law that would have banned the Knights of Columbus, a Catholic fraternal service organization, Evans revoked his membership. Grady subsequently leaked his correspondence with Evans to the media.

In August 1923, Evans participated in a Klan parade in the heavily-Catholic borough of Carnegie, Pennsylvania, which was attacked by local residents. One member of the Klan, Thomas Rankin Abbott, was killed; Evans declared him a martyr and hoped that the death would inspire new recruits. The incident gave a fillip to the Klan's recruitment efforts but increased Stephenson's animosity toward Evans, whom he blamed for the incident. Stephenson's proclivity for ostentation irritated Evans. Although Stephenson left his official Klan position after a short tenure, the Klan's northern supporters, under his leadership, had begun to rival those in the South. He had been a skilled campaigner and demagogue, and he remained a well-known advocate of the Klan's platforms after resigning. Evans avoided publicly clashing with him, fearing that it would hurt the candidacies of Klan-backed politicians since Stephenson was closely involved in the successful gubernatorial candidacy of Indiana Klan-member Edward L. Jackson, and the Klan members had significant electoral gains in that state in 1924, including the election of several candidates to the state legislature. After those victories, Stephenson showed further disdain for Evans.

Although membership in the Klan was limited to men, Simmons, after losing control of the national organization, attempted to create a parallel white supremacist organization for women. Evans established a women's group and sued him. Evans won the lawsuit, leading to a public war of words with Simmons, whose lawyer was soon murdered by Evans's press agent; Evans denied complicity. In 1924, Evans paid Simmons $145,000 for a promise to abandon the latter's claim to Klan leadership.

Then, Evans moved the Klan's national headquarters to Washington, D.C., where the murder of Simmon's lawyer had received less publicity. To Evans's consternation, Stephenson also formed a women's auxiliary group. Evans and Stephenson subsequently exchanged allegations of sexual impropriety. Police charged Stephenson with the kidnapping, rape, and murder of a young woman; he maintained that the charges were orchestrated by Evans. After a sensational trial, Stephenson was convicted of second-degree murder and given a life sentence; the publicity about the leader's behavior caused thousands of members to abandon the Klan.

== Klan growth and political activism ==
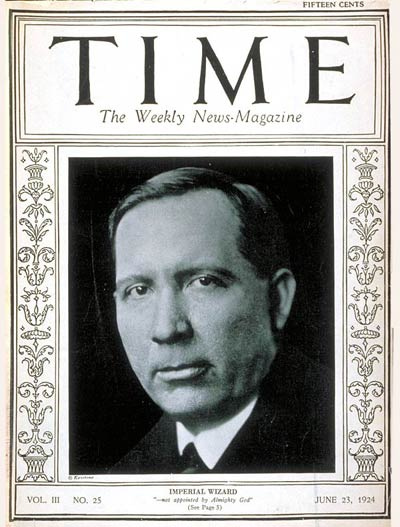
Evans on the cover of Time, June 23, 1924

In the early years of Evans's tenure, the Klan reached record enrollment; estimates of its peak range from 2.5 to 6 million members, but records are poor and the figure cannot be accurately determined. He also dramatically increased the organization's total assets, more than doubling them from July 1922 to July 1923. Evans changed the way that chapter leaders were paid by insisting that they receive a fixed salary, rather than commissions based on membership fees, in a move that lowered their income. Although previous Imperial Wizards had lived in lavish properties, Evans initially settled into an apartment after his promotion. The sociologist Rory McVeigh of the University of Notre Dame argues that the increase in membership was owing to the Klan's exploitation of a "favorable political context," particularly since native-born white-settler Americans were fearful after increased immigration caused them to compete for jobs and housing in many cities. Evans had high hopes for the Klan, saying in 1923 that he aimed to reach 10 million members. That year, he spoke at the largest Klan gathering in history, a Fourth of July meeting in rural Indiana that was attended by over 200,000.

Evans sought to include more members from the Southwest in leadership; previously, the Klan had been led by people from the Southeast. In 1922, Evans supported the successful U.S. Senate candidacy of Texas Democrat Earle Bradford Mayfield, an event that demonstrated that Klan-supported candidates could win prominent offices. The next year, Evans returned to Texas for the state fair, where 75,000 people gathered for a "Klan day" celebration. He devoted funds to fighting Jack C. Walton, the anti-Klan governor of Oklahoma; to the group's joy, Walton was impeached and removed from office in 1923. However, the Oklahoma legislature soon passed several anti-Klan bills.

Evans published instructions for local Klan leaders that detailed how to run meetings, recruit new members, and speak to local gatherings. He advised leaders to avoid "raving hysterically" in favor of "[a] scientific... presentation of facts." In addition, he urged them to forbid members from bringing their Klan regalia home from meetings and to perform background checks on applicants. He instructed Klan members to shun vigilantism but to assist police and attempted, with some success, to recruit police officers into the Klan. Emphasizing the difference between his organization and the more violent 19th-century Ku Klux Klan, Evans formed Klan-themed groups for children. As the Klan attempted to portray itself as a movement led by cultured, well-educated people, its leaders spoke about education in the US. Evans believed that public schools could create a homogeneous society and saw education advocacy as an effective form of public relations.

In his writings on the subject, he cited the nation's illiteracy rate as evidence that American public schools were failing, and he considered low teacher salaries and child labor key obstacles to reform. He supported the idea of a federal Department of Education, hoping that it would lead to improvements in public schools that would help "Americanize the foreigners" and thwart recruitment efforts of Catholic schools. Evans wrote four books in the mid to late 1920s: The Menace of Modern Immigration (1923), The Klan of Tomorrow (1924), Alienism in the Democracy (1927), and The Rising Storm (1929).

After the Klan gained respect and political influence in parts of the US, Evans hoped to replicate this on a national scale. Political involvement was controversial among the organization's members, and Evans issued contradictory statements on the issue, publicly disavowing it but surreptitiously attempting to sway politicians. Apart from fundamental Klan issues, different local groups often held varying political ideologies; as such, by insisting on specific political stances, Evans would have risked alienating members. Although many of his hopes were never realized, Evans saw several Klansmen elected to high offices and, in the mid-1920s, the group was frequently discussed by political commentators.

In 1924, the group convinced Republican Party leaders to avoid criticizing it, prompting Time to put Evans on its cover. That year, the Klan supported Calvin Coolidge in his successful candidacy for president of the U.S. Although Coolidge opposed many key Klan platforms, with the exception of immigration restrictions and prohibition, he was the only major-party candidate who did not condemn them. Nonetheless, Evans declared Coolidge's victory a great success for the Klan. Although Republican leaders refrained from attacking the Klan, they were hesitant to support candidates promoted by the group. Significant discussion of the Klan also took place at the Democratic Party's convention; senator and Democratic presidential primary candidate Oscar Underwood, who finished in fifth place with less than 4% of the delegates, decried them as "a national menace." Evans's attempts to elect Klansmen to public offices in 1924 saw limited success except in Indiana.

== Decline of Klan ==
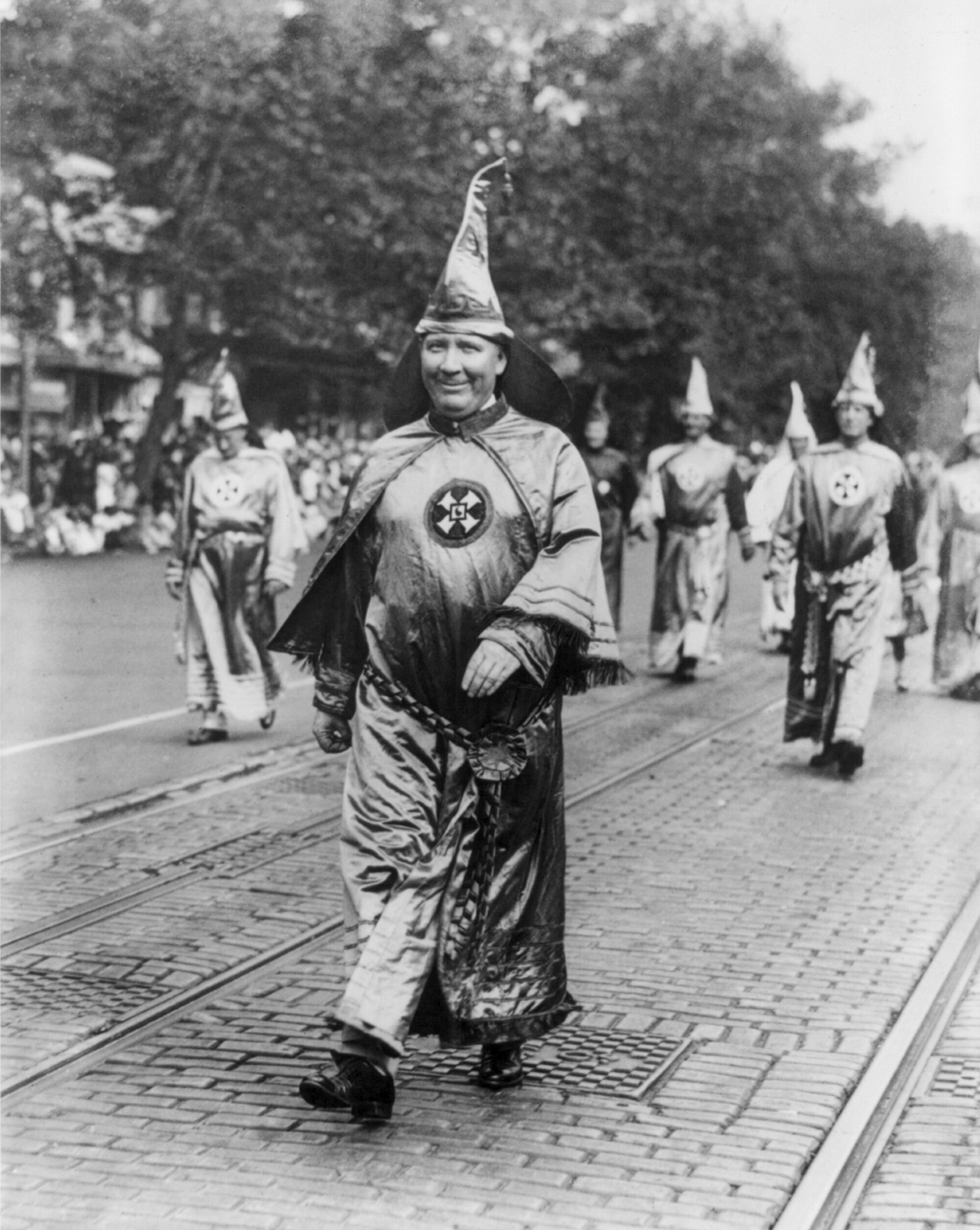
Evans leading his Knights of the Klan on the parade held in Washington, D.C., on September 13, 1926

Although the Klan had four million members in 1924, the group's membership quickly shrank after Stephenson's widely publicized trial. The Indiana Klan lost more than 90% of its members by the end of the proceedings, and there were mass resignations in other states as well. Other scandals emerged, further damaging Klan enrollment. Although the Colorado Klan had seen strong growth, Evans asked the Grand Dragon, John Galen Locke, to resign after local corruption scandals in 1925 involving Klan members who worked in the police force. Evans's request was poorly received by Colorado Klan members, and local enrollment subsequently plummeted.

He encountered difficulties with Klan leaders in Pennsylvania in 1926 after many of them concluded that he was too autocratic. In response, he revoked the charters of several local Klan groups and removed John Strayer, a state legislator, from his position of authority in the Klan. When the Pennsylvania groups continued to refer to themselves as the Ku Klux Klan, Evans sued them in federal court. Pennsylvania Klan members launched a detailed legal offensive against Evans and other Klan leaders, alleging misdeeds, including participation in kidnappings and lynchings. Evans's suit was unsuccessful and, as many newspapers reported the scandalous allegations aired in court, the Pennsylvania Klan suffered a serious decline in membership and support.

In response to the decline in Klan membership, Evans organized a Klan parade in 1926 in Washington, D.C., hoping that a large turnout would demonstrate the Klan's power. About 30,000 members attended, making it the largest parade in the group's history. Evans was disappointed, however, as he had expected twice as many people, and the march did not stanch the drop in membership. That year, Evans attempted to rally U.S. senators to vote against a bill supporting a proposed world court. He was unsuccessful, however, and several Klan-backed senators followed Coolidge and supported the bill. In 1928, Evans opposed the candidacy of the New York Democratic governor Al Smith for president and emphasized the threat of Smith's Catholic faith. After the Republican Herbert Hoover won the election, Evans boldly claimed responsibility for Smith's loss, but most of the solidly-Democratic South had rejected Hoover and voted for Smith against the Klan's advice.

In 1929, Evans acknowledged that membership levels had declined but inaccurately predicted a dramatic turnaround would soon occur. The loss of members resulted in a Klan that was a skeleton of its former self. Historians have attributed this loss of membership to ineptness and hypocrisy on the part of Klan leadership. McVeigh argues that the Klan's inability to form alliances with other political groups led to the sharp loss of political power and solidarity within the group.

== Changes in focus ==
Although many Democratic Klan members initially supported the 1932 presidential campaign of Franklin Roosevelt, the Klan later officially turned against him because of his acceptance of endorsements from minorities and labor unions. After Roosevelt's election, Evans fiercely opposed the New Deal, describing it as a "great danger" to the nation, and argued that it was a "Jewish" policy that endangered American freedom, reserving particular scorn for Treasury Secretary Henry Morgenthau Jr., who was Jewish. Evans's statements about Jews were sometimes contradictory: he argued that he was not an anti-Semite but maintained that Jews were materialistic and resisted assimilation. The Klan subsequently launched an offensive against organized labor. In the 1930s, Evans fiercely condemned communism and unionism and began to suspect that government agencies had been infiltrated by communists. He focused his attacks on the Congress of Industrial Organizations, claiming that they sought to "flout law and promote social disorder."

Although Evans bemoaned commercialism and attributed it to the effects of liberalism, he supported capitalism and sought to form ties between business leaders and the Klan. He condemned corporate greed, alleging that wealthy elites' desire for cheap labor led to increased immigration. In his view, corporations had changed the Eastern US so that it no longer reflected "true Americanism," a concept that he believed could be understood only by "legitimate Americans" such as himself. He blamed an influx of unskilled laborers for lowering wages in the U.S. Evans believed that immigration policy should restrict the immigration of unskilled workers except for those needed on farms.

In 1934, Evans encountered public controversy after it was revealed that he intended to travel to Louisiana to campaign against the Democratic governor Huey Long, who planned to run in the 1936 presidential election. Long learned of Evans's plans and condemned him in a speech at the Louisiana State Legislature, deriding him as a "tooth-puller" and an "Imperial bastard" and warning of grave consequences should he follow through with his plans. After learning of the potential opposition, Evans cancelled his plans but retorted that Long, who based his campaign on Americanist themes, was "un-American."

== Downfall and death ==
In the 1930s, the Klan's public support greatly diminished and their membership dropped to about 100,000 people, primarily concentrated in the South, having lost most of their members elsewhere. James A. Colescott, Evans's handpicked chief of staff, then increasingly shouldered Evans's responsibilities. After the Great Depression further damaged the Klan's finances, the group's leadership sold their Atlanta headquarters in 1936. Around then, Evans announced his intention to retire.

Although anti-Catholicism had been a consistent platform of the Klan, before leaving the organization, Evans renounced his anti-Catholicism and pronounced a "new era of religious tolerance." In 1939, he said that "in no other time in history has there been more need for all people who believe in the same Father and same Son to stand together." That year, Evans also publicly expressed an interest in learning aspects of Judaism to understand the Old Testament better. Chester L. Quarles, a professor of criminal justice at the University of Mississippi, argues that Evans repudiated anti-Catholicism because of his desire to fight unions and communism and his fear of having too many enemies at one time.

After Evans sold the Klan's former headquarters, it was purchased by the Catholic Church. The Cathedral of Christ the King was later built on the site. Evans attended the building's dedication and spoke highly of the service, surprising many observers. His attendance at the service was his last significant public appearance as Imperial Wizard: he stepped down soon afterwards, having become deeply unpopular with members of the Klan, who felt that he had embraced their enemies. He resigned on June 10, 1939, and was replaced as Imperial Wizard by Colescott.

Evans's service as Imperial Wizard proved to be a lucrative position, allowing him to maintain a large residence in a prestigious Atlanta neighborhood. In the mid-1930s, however, Klan funds dwindled, and he worked for a Georgia-based construction company selling products to the Georgia Highway Board. At the same time, he was a staunch supporter of Georgia Governor Eurith D. Rivers, a liberal pro-New Deal Democrat whom he had previously employed as a lecturer. The political support that he provided the administration allowed Evans to sell to the highway board without bidding against other contractors. In 1940, the state of Georgia charged Evans and a member of the state highway board with price fixing. The Attorney General of Georgia, Ellis Arnall, directed legal proceedings against Evans that resulted in a $15,000 fine.

Meanwhile, Colescott attempted to resuscitate the waning second Klan by an "administration of action" and stricter enforcement of the Klan's stated policies and led extensive recruitment campaigns. Despite concerns by opponents that the Klan would regain full force after the conclusion of World War II, it was unable to improve its membership and was under pressure from the Internal Revenue Service for failure to pay taxes. Through a decree on April 23, 1944, Colescott formally disbanded the Klan. Locally-sponsored groups continued to use the name but lacked the united leadership of the earlier Klan.

As late as 1949, Evans was a commentator on Klan activities, speaking as the former Imperial Wizard. He died on September 14, 1966, in Atlanta.

== Appraisal ==
David A. Horowitz, a historian at Portland State University, credits Evans with changing the Klan "from a confederation of local vigilantes into a centralized and powerful political movement." Fellow historian William D. Jenkins of Youngstown State University maintains that Evans was "personally corrupt and more interested in money or power than a cause." During Evans's tenure as Imperial Wizard, the New York Times characterized the Klan's leadership as "shrewd schemers". However, Rice suggests that Evans's reforms would never have been successful, as the Klan remained a white supremacist organization that "automatically made enemies of ... anyone who happened to be foreign-born, Negro, Catholic, Jewish, or opposed to bigotry and chauvinism."

An editorial in The New York Times during Evans's tenure as Klan leader described him as "severe and logical" in his writing, but the historian Richard Hofstadter described Evans's writings as not immoderate in tone. The communications specialist Nicolas Rangel Jr. of the University of Houston–Downtown suggests that the vernacular prevented some Americans from recognizing the extremist nature of Evans's views.

Evans's ideology was attacked by numerous contemporaries; these criticisms began early in his Klan career. David Lefkowitz, rabbi of Temple Emanu-El in Dallas, assailed Evans's assertion that Jews did not assimilate, emphasizing American experiences shared by Jews and Christians, such as military service in World War I. James Weldon Johnson, leader of the NAACP, responded to Evans's promotion of white supremacy by contending that "all races are mixed." Other well-known adversaries of Evans included the minister and theologian Reinhold Niebuhr, who opposed the Klan in Detroit in 1925, describing them as "one of the worst specific social phenomena which the religious pride of a people has ever developed." The Dallas Morning News publisher George Dealey and Atlanta journalist Ralph McGill opposed him, the latter deriding him for his hypocrisy and false claims about minorities.

Several publications, however, gave positive coverage to Evans but not necessarily his work with the Klan. In 1927, The New York Times congratulated Evans on his "modest and engaging exposition of 'Americanism'". Although the Klan disowned Evans for reaching out to the Catholic Church, popular opinion was more positive. In 1939, the Palm Beach Daily News described the meeting between Evans and Cardinal Dennis Joseph Dougherty as stirring both religious and secular circles; favorable coverage of the meeting was found in several other publications. Dougherty said that he had found Evans "intensely interested in religious subjects" outside Protestantism.

== Bibliography ==
Books

- Bennett, David H. (1988), The Party of Fear: From Nativist Movements to the New Right in American History, University of North Carolina Press, ISBN 978-0-8078-1772-8
- Blee, Kathleen M. (2009), Women of the Klan: Racism and Gender in the 1920s, University of California Press, ISBN 978-0-520-25787-0
- Chalmers, David Mark (1981), Hooded Americanism: The History of the Ku Klux Klan, Duke University Press, ISBN 978-0-8223-0772-3
- Dobratz, Betty A.; Shanks-Meile, Stephanie L. (2000), The White Separatist Movement in the United States: "White Power, White Pride!", JHU Press, ISBN 978-0-8018-6537-4
- Gitlin, Marty (2009), The Ku Klux Klan: A Guide to an American Subculture, ABC-CLIO, ISBN 978-0-313-36576-8
- Horowitz, David A. (1997), Beyond Left & Right: Insurgency and the Establishment, University of Illinois Press, ISBN 978-0-252-06568-2
- Jackson, Kenneth T. (1967), The Ku Klux Klan in the City, 1915–1930, Oxford University Press, OCLC 249235
- Jenkins, William D. (1990), Steel Valley Klan: The Ku Klux Klan in Ohio's Mahoning Valley, Kent State University Press, ISBN 978-0-87338-694-4
- McVeigh, Rory (2009), The Rise of the Ku Klux Klan: Right-Wing Movements and National Politics, University of Minnesota Press, ISBN 978-0-8166-5619-6
- Moore, Leonard Joseph (1997), Citizen Klansmen: The Ku Klux Klan in Indiana, 1921–1928, University of North Carolina Press, ISBN 978-0-8078-4627-8
- Newton, Michael (2010), The Ku Klux Klan in Mississippi: a History, McFarland, ISBN 978-0-7864-4653-7
- Pegram, Thomas R. (2011), One Hundred Percent American: The Rebirth and Decline of the Ku Klux Klan in the 1920s, Rowman & Littlefield, ISBN 978-1-56663-711-4
- Phillips, Michael (2006), White Metropolis: Race, Ethnicity, and Religion in Dallas, 1841–2001, University of Texas Press, ISBN 978-0-292-71274-4
- Quarles, Chester L. (1999), The Ku Klux Klan and Related American Racialist and Antisemitic Organizations: a History and Analysis, McFarland, ISBN 978-0-7864-0647-0
- Rice, Arnold S. (1962), The Ku Klux Klan in American Politics, Public Affairs Press, OCLC 1315079
- Sims, Patsy (1996), The Klan, University Press of Kentucky, ISBN 978-0-8131-0887-2
- Snell, William R. (1987), Sarah Woolfolk Wiggins (ed.), From Civil War to Civil Rights—Alabama, 1860–1960: an Anthology from the Alabama Review, University of Alabama Press, ISBN 978-0-8173-0341-9
- Stone, Bryan Edward (2010), The Chosen Folks: Jews on the Frontiers of Texas, University of Texas Press, ISBN 978-0-292-72177-7
- Tindall, George Brown (1967), The Emergence of the New South, 1913–1945, LSU Press, ISBN 978-0-8071-0010-3
- Tucker, Todd (2004), Notre Dame vs. the Klan: How the Fighting Irish Defeated the Ku Klux Klan, Loyola Press, ISBN 978-0-8294-1771-5
- Wade, Wyn Craig (1998), The Fiery Cross: The Ku Klux Klan in America, Oxford University Press, ISBN 978-0-19-512357-9

Journals

- Rangel, Nicolas Jr. (Summer 2009), "Ambiguously Articulating "Americanism": The Rhetoric of Hiram Wesley Evans and the Klan of the 1920s" (PDF), American Communication Journal, 11 (2)

Government records

- "Entry for Hiram Wesley Evans". United States, Selective Service System. World War I Draft Registration Cards, 1917–1918. Ancestry.com.
- "Entry for Hiram W. Evans". State of Georgia, Indexes of Vital Records for Georgia: Deaths, 1919–1998. Ancestry.com.

News

- "Advertisement". The Hutchinson News. November 17, 1926. p. 5.
- "Cardinal Dougherty Greets Imperial Wizard of the Klan". Palm Beach Daily News. January 19, 1939. pp. 1, 5.
- "Church, Klan Leaders Meet". The Telegraph-Herald. January 18, 1939. p. 13.
- "Emperor Hiram". The New York Times. December 24, 1927.
- Glass, Richard C. (August 19, 1949). "Anonymous Group Will Pick Successor Soon for Samuel Green". Tri-City Herald. p. 5.
- "Head Klansman Dies Suddenly". Warsaw Herald. August 20, 1949. p. 2.

Web

- Maxwell, Lisa C. (June 12, 2010), "Evans, Hiram Wesley", The Handbook of Texas Online, Texas State Historical Association

Preceded by William Joseph Simmons	Imperial Wizard of the Ku Klux Klan; 1922–1939	Succeeded by James A. Colescott
Awards and achievements
Preceded by Pope Pius XI	Cover of Time magazine June 23, 1924	Succeeded by William Howard Taft
