= Ku Klux Klan =

American white supremacist hate group

- Mystic Insignia of a Klansman (commonly known as Blood Drop Cross), the KKK's best-known emblem since the early 20th century
- Political position: Far-right

First Klan (1865–1872)
- Founded in: Pulaski, Tennessee, U.S.
- Political ideologies: Anti-black racism; White supremacy; White nationalism; Nativism; Segregationism (Note: The Ku Klux Klan opposed the civil rights and Black rights movements, and often killed Black people that either committed crimes, or simply exercised their rights of voting, owning guns, land, etc.)

Second Klan (1915–1944)
- Founded in: Stone Mountain, Georgia, U.S.
- Members: c. 3 million – 6 million (Note: Peaked in 1924–1925)
- Political ideologies (Note: In addition to previous Klan ideologies): Anglo-Saxonism; Right-wing populism; Anti-Catholicism; Antisemitism; Anti-atheism; Homophobia

Third Klan (1946/1950–present)
- Founded in: Stone Mountain, Georgia, U.S.
- Members: c. 5,000–8,000
- Political ideologies: Social conservatism (Note: The Third KKK is anti-feminist, anti-abortion, and anti-LGBT.); Anti-miscegenation; Anti-globalization; Islamophobia

The Ku Klux Klan (Note: Pronounced /ˌkuː klʌks ˈklæn, ˌkjuː-/; erroneously pronounced /ˌkluː-/) (KKK), also known as "The Klan", is an American far-right hate group. It has emerged in three major waves throughout its history. The ideologies of various Klan offshoots have differed, but mostly share beliefs of White supremacy, anti-Black racism, and racial segregation. Its tactics have included intimidation, violence, and bombings to achieve specific aims such as suppressing black voters, weakening emerging civil rights movements, and maintaining a racial hierarchy with White Protestants at the top. The klan has operated through a decentralized network of multiple small, autonomous, and affiliated organizations since the 1950s–1960s civil rights era.

The first Klan emerged during Reconstruction, founded by former Confederate soldiers who opposed federal efforts to extend civil and political rights to formerly enslaved people. It carried out widespread violence against black voters, officeholders, and their white allies in an effort to undermine Republican state governments and restore white Democratic control in the South. Federal Enforcement Acts and prosecutions beginning in 1871 significantly weakened this iteration. A second Klan, founded in 1915 and reaching its peak in the 1920s, expanded beyond the South and attracted millions of members from segments of the native-born white Protestant population. It promoted nativism, racial segregation, and "100 percent Americanism" in hostile opposition to Catholicism among others, and engaged in intimidation and, at times, mob violence. A third wave arose in the mid-20th century in response to the civil rights movement; although smaller, it included groups that carried out acts of racial terror aimed at resisting desegregation and racial equality.

Despite differences in size and structure, all iterations shared core ideological elements, including white supremacy, racial segregation, and hostility toward perceived outsiders. Over time, Klan groups espoused positions associated with white nationalism, anti-immigration nativism, antisemitism, anti-Catholicism, anti-atheism, anti-communism, homophobia, Islamophobia, and opposition to civil rights reforms. Some members framed their activities as defending "Americanism" and Christian morality, and certain local chapters sought social respectability through parades, charitable events, and political organizing. Despite being Protestant-led, major Protestant bodies have formally condemned the Klan's ideology and methods as incompatible with its theology.

The Klan is widely viewed as a violent extremist movement that contributed to systematic racial oppression and domestic terrorism. Modern scholarship has documented its extensive use of intimidation, lynching, and political violence, emphasizing its long-term impact on American history. Earlier supporters offered alternative interpretations, portraying the Klan as a patriotic or law-and-order organization responding to social or political upheaval. They cited agreement with its racial policies, approval of its fraternal or charitable activities, and the belief that it upheld "law and public morality." Historians generally contrast these justifications with extensive records of Klan violence and coercion, highlighting the gap between the organization's self‑presentation and its documented actions.

== Origins ==
=== First Klan ===
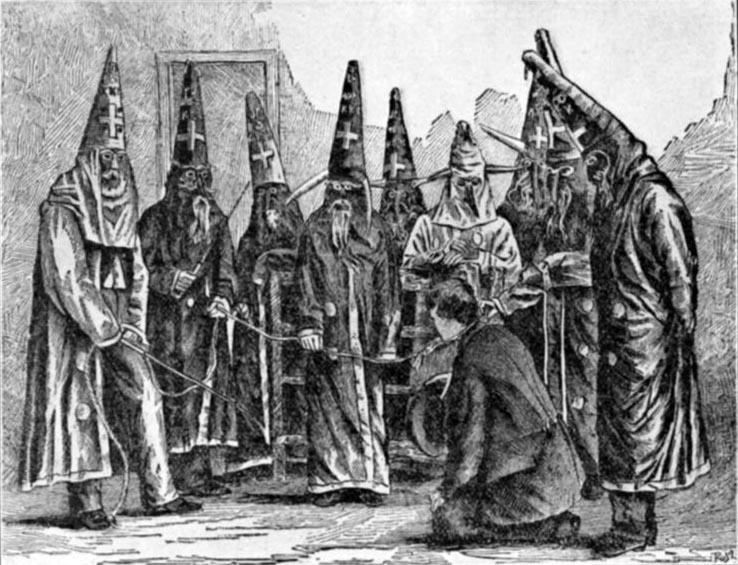
Depiction of Ku Klux Klan in North Carolina in 1870, based on a photograph taken under the supervision of a federal officer who seized Klan costumes

The first Klan was founded in Pulaski, Tennessee, on December 24, 1865, by six former officers of the Confederate Army: Frank McCord, Richard Reed, John Lester, John Kennedy, J. Calvin Jones, and James Crowe. It began as a fraternal social club inspired in part by the then largely defunct Sons of Malta. According to The Cyclopædia of Fraternities (1907), the group borrowed elements of its initiation ceremonies from that organization, with the same stated purpose: "ludicrous initiations, the baffling of public curiosity, and amusement for members", in which "in each of these directions it was singularly successful". The manual of rituals was printed by Laps D. McCord of Pulaski. The origins of the hood are uncertain; it may have been adapted from the Spanish capirote hood, or it may derive from "folk traditions of carnival, circus, minstrelsy, Mardi Gras – or mid-century 'Calico Indians'" associated with the Anti-Rent War in upstate New York.

The Cyclopædia of Fraternities (1907) also stated: "Beginning in April, 1867, there was a gradual transformation. ... The members had conjured up a veritable Frankenstein. They had played with an engine of power and mystery, though organized on entirely innocent lines, and found themselves overcome by a belief that something must lie behind it all—that there was, after all, a serious purpose, a work for the Klan to do."

The KKK had no organizational structure above the chapter level. However, similar groups across the South adopted comparable goals. Klan chapters promoted white supremacy and spread throughout the region as an insurgent movement resisting Reconstruction. Confederate veteran John W. Morton founded a Klan chapter in Nashville, Tennessee. As a secret vigilante organization, the Klan targeted freedmen and their allies, seeking to restore white supremacy through threats and violence, including murder. According to J. Michael Martinez, the Klan "targeted white Northern leaders, Southern sympathizers and politically active blacks." In 1870 and 1871, the federal government passed the Enforcement Acts, which were designed to prosecute and suppress Klan crimes.

The first Klan had mixed results in achieving its objectives; although it significantly weakened black political leadership through assassinations and threats of violence, driving some individuals out of public life, it also provoked a strong backlash, including the passage of federal legislation that historian Eric Foner describes as successful in "restoring order, reinvigorating the morale of Southern Republicans, and enabling blacks to exercise their rights as citizens". Historian George C. Rable argues that the Klan was ultimately a political failure and was therefore abandoned by Democratic Party leaders in the South. He writes:

The Klan declined in strength in part because of internal weaknesses; its lack of central organization and the failure of its leaders to control criminal elements and sadists. More fundamentally, it declined because it failed to achieve its central objective – the overthrow of Republican state governments in the South.

After the Klan was suppressed, similar insurgent paramilitary groups emerged that were explicitly dedicated to suppressing Republican voting and removing Republicans from office. These included the White League, founded in Louisiana in 1874, and the Red Shirts, which originated in Mississippi and later developed chapters in the Carolinas. The Red Shirts, for example, are credited with helping elect Wade Hampton as governor in South Carolina, acting as the military arm of the Democratic Party and contributing to the restoration of white Democratic control of state legislatures throughout the South. According to Historian George C. Rable, the Red Shirts "formed a solid line around the ballot boxes and prevented Negros without Democratic tickets from approaching", and even when federal troops attempted to clear a path, "many had gone home".

=== Second Klan ===
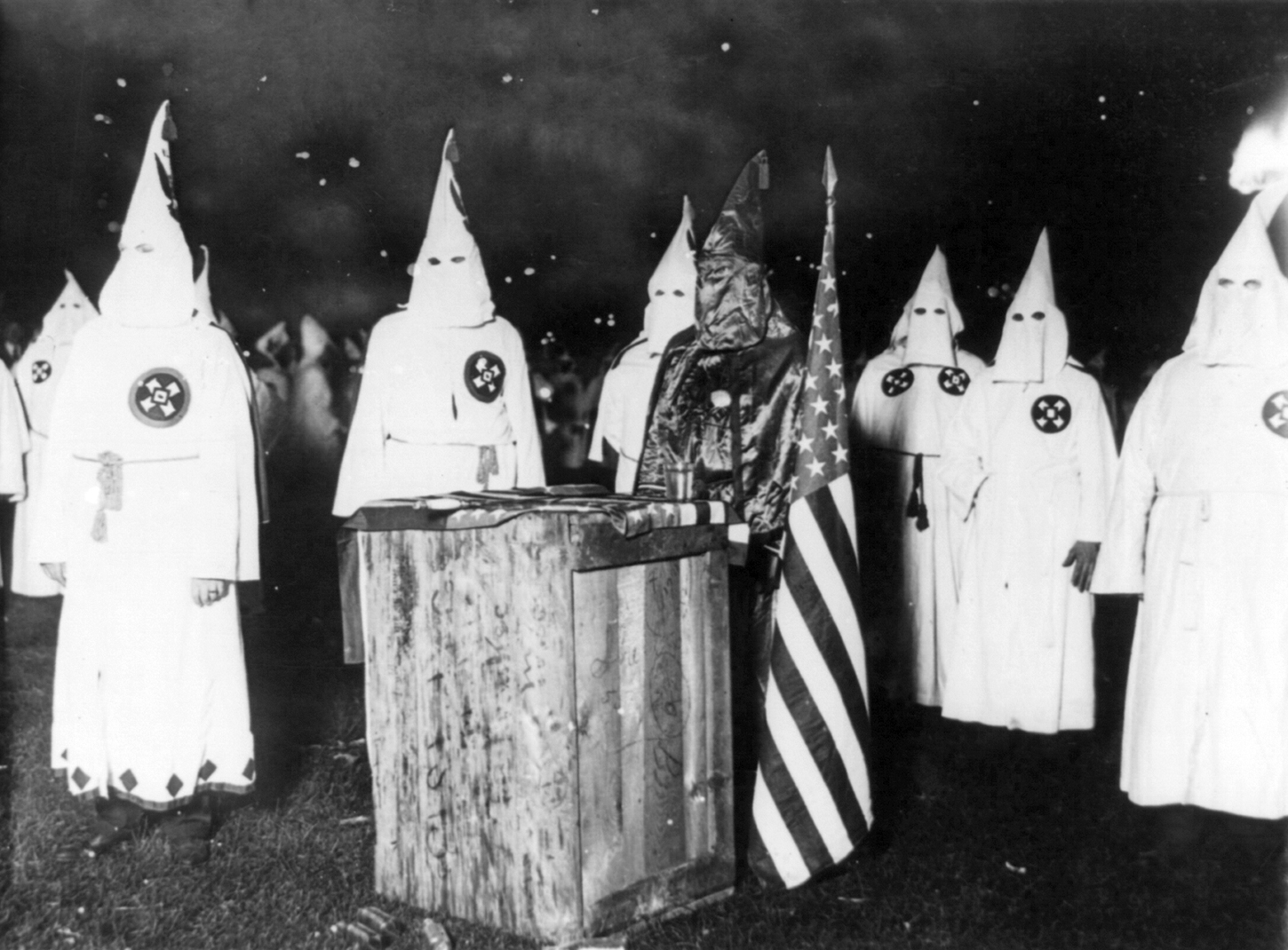
KKK rally near Chicago in the 1920s

In 1915, the second Klan was founded atop Stone Mountain, Georgia, by William Joseph Simmons. While Simmons relied on documents from the original Klan and on the recollections of surviving members, the revived organization drew significant inspiration from the film The Birth of a Nation. The earlier Klan had not worn white costumes or burned crosses; these elements were introduced in Thomas Dixon's 1905 fictional novel The Clansman: A Historical Romance of the Ku Klux Klan, on which the film was based. When the film was shown in Atlanta in December of that year, Simmons and his new Klansmen paraded to the theater in robes and pointed hoods—many on robed horses—mirroring the imagery depicted in the film. These mass parades became a hallmark of the new Klan that had not existed in the first iteration.

Beginning in 1921, the second Klan adopted a modern business system that relied on full-time, paid recruiters, and it appealed to prospective members as a fraternal organization similar to many others flourishing at the time. The national headquarters profited from a monopoly on costume sales, while organizers retained initiation fees. The organization grew rapidly nationwide during a period of economic prosperity.

Writer W. J. Cash, in his 1941 book The Mind of the South, characterized the second Klan as "anti-Negro, anti-Alien, anti-Red, anti-Catholic, anti-Jew, anti-Darwin, anti-Modern, anti-Liberal, Fundamentalist, vastly Moral, [and] militantly Protestant. And summing up these fears, it brought them into focus with the tradition of the past, and above all with the ancient Southern pattern of high romantic histrionics, violence and mass coercion of the scapegoat and the heretic." The organization preached "One Hundred Percent Americanism" and called for the purification of politics, advocating strict morality and stronger enforcement of Prohibition. Its official rhetoric emphasized the perceived threat of the Catholic Church, drawing on anti-Catholicism and nativism. Its appeal was directed exclusively toward white Protestants, and it opposed Catholics, Jews, black people, and newly arriving Southern and Eastern European immigrants, many of whom were Jewish or Catholic.

Some local Klan groups threatened violence against rum-runners and individuals they considered "notorious sinners"; the relatively few violent incidents associated with the second Klan occurred primarily in the South. The Red Knights, a militant group formed in opposition to the Klan, responded violently to Klan provocations on several occasions.

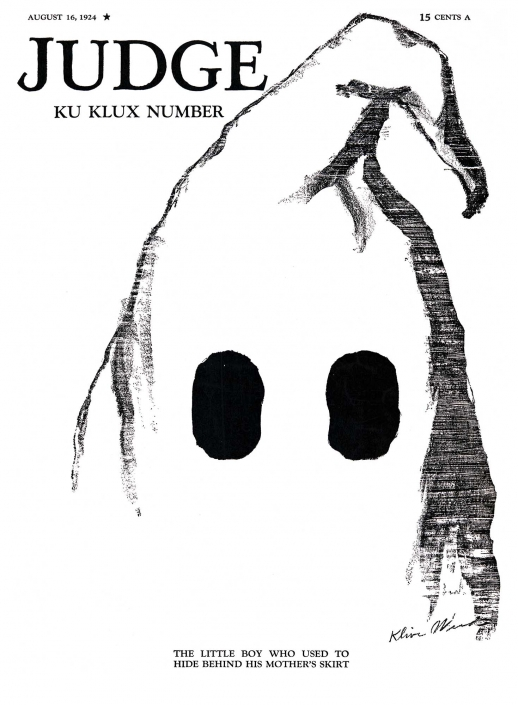
The "Ku Klux Number" of Judge, August 16, 1924

The Second Klan was a formal fraternal organization with national and state structures. During its peak years, its publicity was managed by the Southern Publicity Association, owned and operated by Edward Young Clarke and Mary Elizabeth Tyler, who created a Propagation Department to "publicize and recruit for the Klan in exchange for a percentage of the Klan's $10 initiation fee". During the first six months of Clarke and Tyler's campaign, "an additional 85,000 members (representing $850,000 in dues) joined" with further claims by Simmons in a 1922 New York Times interview that "the Klan was accepting 3,500 new members a day and had a total of five million members in all forty‑eight states plus Alaska and the Canal Zone". Even with claims of exaggeration, there was no doubt that "the Klan had undergone a dramatic reversal of fortune". At its height in the mid-1920s, the organization's membership was estimated at between three and eight million people.

In 1923, Simmons was ousted as leader of the KKK by Hiram Wesley Evans. From September 1923 onward, two national Ku Klux Klan organizations existed: the original group founded by Simmons and led by Evans, whose strength lay primarily in the southern United States, and a breakaway organization led by Grand Dragon D. C. Stephenson based in Evansville, Indiana, with membership concentrated in the Midwest.

Internal divisions, criminal behavior by leaders—especially Stephenson's conviction for the abduction, rape, and murder of Madge Oberholtzer—and external opposition contributed to a sharp decline in membership in both national Klan groups. The main group's membership had fell to about 30,000 by 1930, and it declined even more rapidly in the 1940s.

Klan organizers also operated in Canada, particularly in Saskatchewan in 1926 and 1928, where Klansmen denounced immigrants from Eastern Europe as a threat to Canada's "Anglo-Saxon" heritage.

=== Third Klan ===
The "Ku Klux Klan" name was used by numerous independent local secret groups opposing the civil rights movement and desegregation, especially in the 1950s and 1960s. These groups sometimes formed informal alliances with Southern police departments, as in Birmingham, Alabama, or with governors' offices, as in the case of George Wallace of Alabama. In Wallace's case, his campaign has been described as having "breathed oxygen into an old Klan hand", with Robert Chambliss organizing "Klansmen to put up Wallace signs" and "haul[ing] Wallace literature", and with Klan gossip alleging that Wallace had "forwarded $7,500 to Imperial Wizard Bobby Shelton to cover the boys' expenses" and promised them an "all-expenses-paid fishing trip to the Gulf if he was elected." Several activists associated with the so-called third Klan were convicted of murder in connection with the deaths of civil rights workers in Mississippi in 1964 and of children in the bombing of the 16th Street Baptist Church in Birmingham in 1963, including Robert Chambliss.

The United States government has classified the third Klan as a "subversive terrorist organization". In April 1997, FBI agents arrested four members of the True Knights of the Ku Klux Klan in Dallas for conspiracy to commit robbery and for conspiring to blow up a natural gas processing plant. In 1999, the city council of Charleston, South Carolina, passed a resolution declaring the Klan a terrorist organization.

Groups associated with the third Klan have been in a state of consistent decline. Contributing factors include the public's negative perception of the group's image, platform, and history; infiltration and prosecution by law enforcement; financial penalties resulting from civil lawsuits; and the view among some radical right-wing groups that the Klan is outdated and unfashionable. The Southern Poverty Law Center reported that between 2016 and 2019, the number of Klan groups in the United States dropped from 130 to 51. A 2016 report by the Anti-Defamation League estimated that just over 30 third Klan groups remained active. Estimates of total collective membership range from about 3,000 to 8,000. In addition to its active membership, the third Klan has an "unknown number of associates and supporters".

== History ==
=== First Klan: 1865–1871 ===
==== Creation, etymology, and naming ====
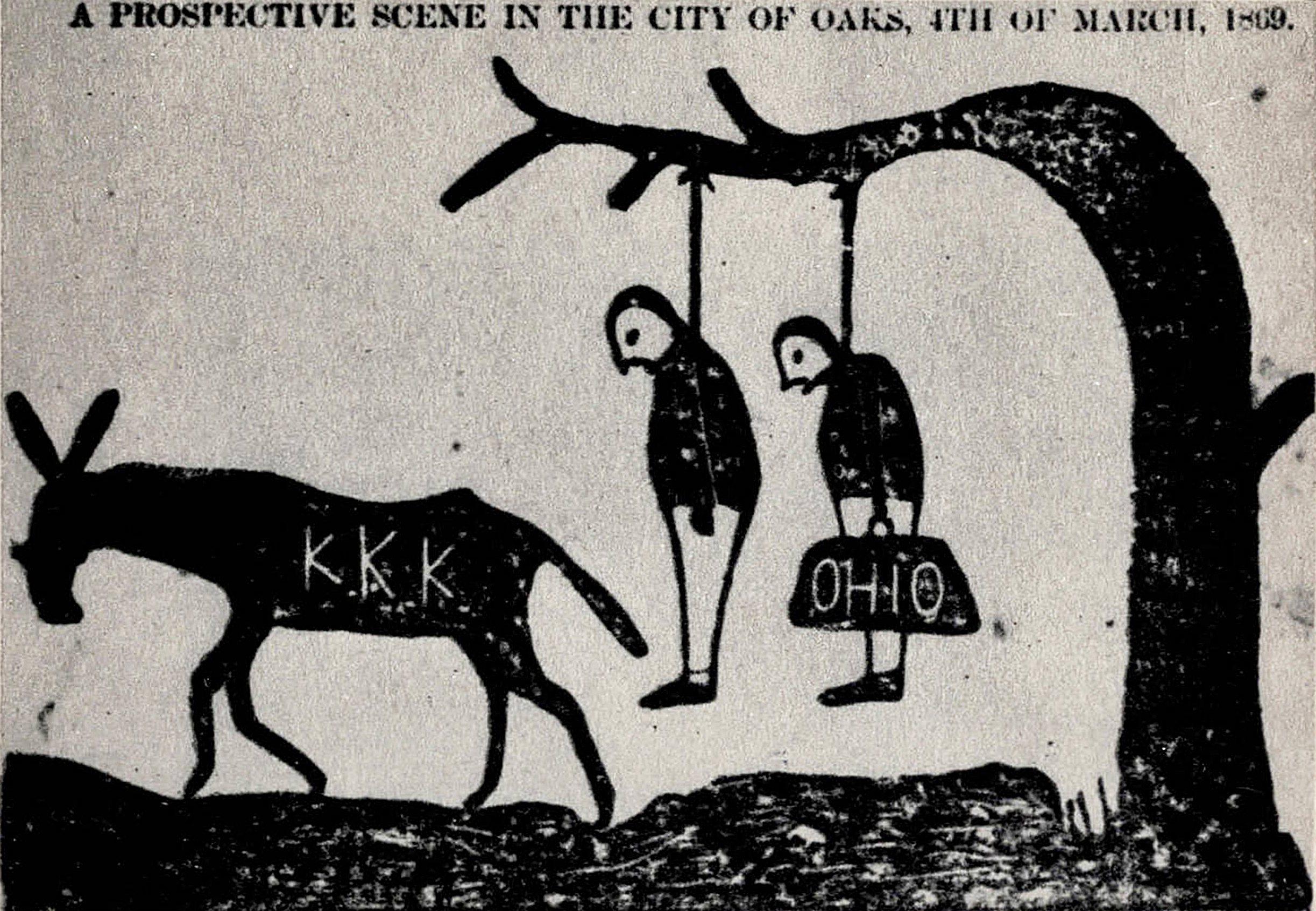
A cartoon threatening that the KKK (represented by a Democratic donkey) will lynch scalawags (left) and carpetbaggers (right) on March 4, 1869, the day President Grant takes office. Tuscaloosa, Alabama, Independent Monitor, September 1, 1868. (Note: An analysis of this cartoon can be found in Hubbs 2015)

During Reconstruction in the South, six Confederate veterans from Pulaski, Tennessee, created the First Ku Klux Klan on December 24, 1865; it was known for a short time as the "Kuklux Clan". The name was probably formed in 1865 by combining the Greek kyklos (κύκλος, which means circle) with clan. The word had previously been used for other fraternal organizations in the South, such as Kuklos Adelphon. The Klan was one of several secret, oath-bound organizations that used means of violence to pursue political objectives, including the Southern Cross in New Orleans (1865) and the Knights of the White Camelia (1867) in Louisiana.

Historians view the first iteration as a violent effort to reverse the dramatically changed social order through extrajudicial means, with the goal of restoring white supremacy in post–Civil War America. In 1866, William L. Sharkey, the governor of Mississippi, reported widespread disorder, lack of control, and lawlessness. In other Southern states, armed bands of former Confederate soldiers roamed largely unchecked. In the context of this instability and weak authority, the Klan systematically used violence against black people and their white allies as a means of intimidation, burning houses and killing black people and leaving their bodies on the roads.

At an 1867 meeting in Nashville, Tennessee, first-generation Klan activists attempted to create a hierarchical organization in which local chapters would report to a centralized national headquarters; most members were veterans familiar with military hierarchies. This effort failed, and local chapters and bands remained highly independent, never operating under any durable centralized structure.

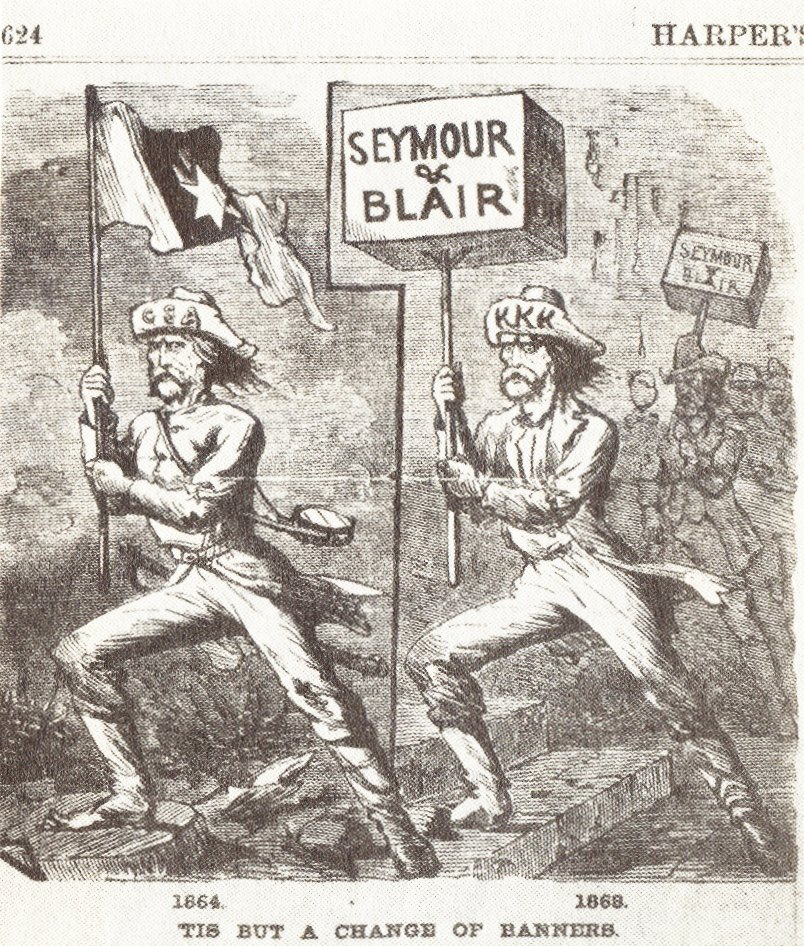
This Harper's Weekly cartoon links the 1868 Democratic candidates Horatio Seymour and Francis Preston Blair Jr. with secession and the Confederate cause.

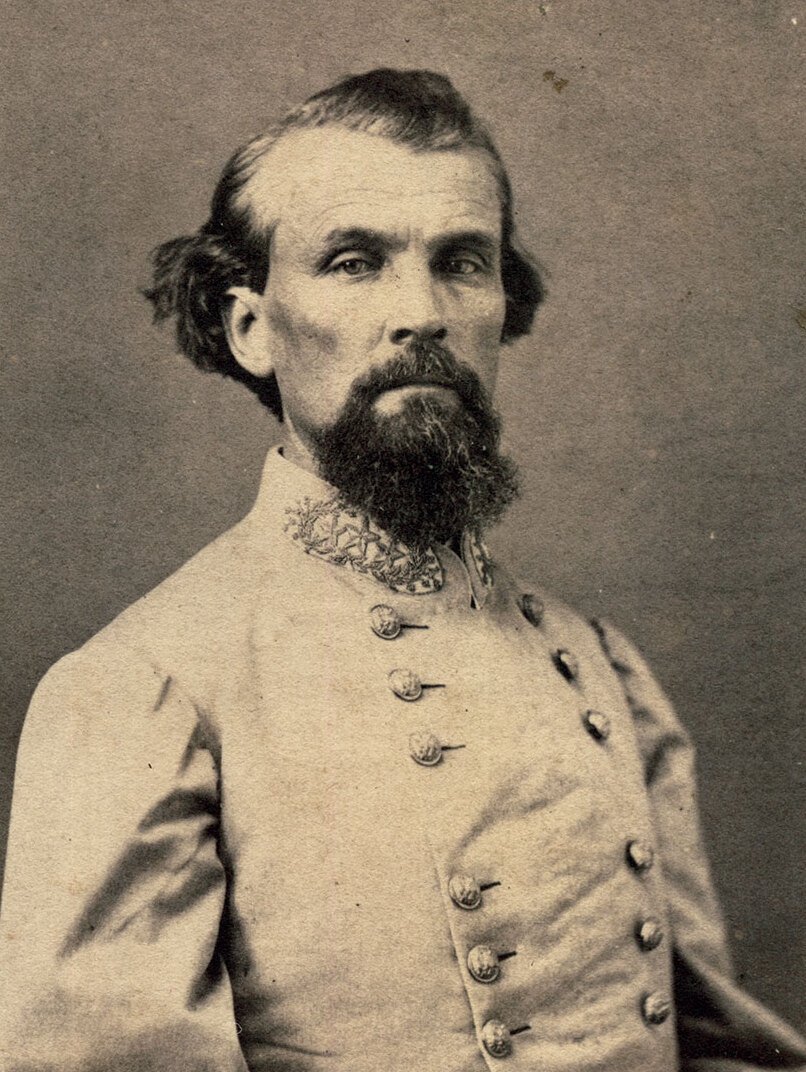
Nathan Bedford Forrest, first Grand Wizard of the Klan, pictured in 1864 wearing his Confederate uniform

Former Confederate brigadier general George Gordon developed the Prescript, which espoused white supremacist beliefs. For instance, an applicant was to be asked whether he favored "a white man's government", "the reenfranchisement and emancipation of the white men of the South, and the restitution of the Southern people to all their rights". The latter phrase refers to the Ironclad Oath, which stripped the vote from white persons who refused to swear that they had not borne arms against the Union.

Confederate general Nathan Bedford Forrest was elected the first grand wizard and claimed to be the Klan's national leader. In an 1868 newspaper interview, Forrest said the Klan's primary opposition was to the Loyal Leagues, the state governments of the radical Republicans, opposing individuals like Tennessee governor William Gannaway Brownlow, and "carpetbaggers" and "scalawags". He also argued that many Southerners believed that black people were voting for the Republican Party because they were being hoodwinked by the Loyal Leagues. One Alabama newspaper editor declared: "The League is nothing more than a nigger Ku Klux Klan."

Despite Gordon's and Forrest's work, local Klan chapters never accepted the Prescript as they operated autonomously with no hierarchical levels or a state headquarters. Members utilized violence to settle old personal feuds and local grudges, working to restore general white dominance in the disrupted post-war society. Historian Elaine Frantz Parsons describes the membership as the following:

Lifting the Klan mask revealed a chaotic multitude of antiblack vigilante groups, disgruntled poor white farmers, wartime guerrilla bands, displaced Democratic politicians, illegal whiskey distillers, coercive moral reformers, bored young men, sadists, rapists, white workmen fearful of black competition, employers trying to enforce labor discipline, common thieves, neighbors with decades-old grudges, and even a few freedmen and white Republicans who allied with Democratic whites or had criminal agendas of their own. Indeed, all they had in common, besides being overwhelmingly white, southern, and Democratic, was that they called themselves, or were called, Klansmen.

Historian Eric Foner observed that the Klan was "a military force" that served "the interests of the Democratic party, the planter class, and all those who desired the restoration of white supremacy", as it had a purpose of "affect[ing] power relations ... throughout Southern society" by thoroughly destroying the "Republican party's infrastructure", breaking the "Reconstruction state", reestablishing "control of the black labor force" and "restoring racial subordination" in all aspects "of Southern life." The organization worked to stifle the education, economic advancement, voting rights, and right to keep and bear arms of black individuals. The first Klan mobilized and spread into every Southern state, launching a coordinated campaign of terror against Republican leaders, both black and white.

==== Activities and tactics ====
===== Whipping attacks, killings, and cruelty =====
Meant to resemble previous conditions of servitude, the early Klan's seemingly random whipping activities became a widespread practice. In a 1933 interview, William Sellers, born enslaved in Virginia, recalled that the Ku Klux Clan raids of Rockingham County would involve going into the huts of "the recently freed negros" or "catch[ing] some negro... on his way home from work...and cruelly whip him, leaving him to live or die". In Limestone Township, between 1870 and 1871, which is now Cherokee County, South Carolina, out of 77 documented attacks, "four were shot, sixty-seven whipped and six had their ears cropped". The First Klan attacked black members of the Loyal Leagues and intimidated white Republicans and Freedman's Bureau workers. When they killed black political leaders, they also took heads of families, along with the leaders of churches and community groups, because these people had many roles in society. Agents of the Freedman's Bureau reported weekly assaults and murders of black people. Klansmen killed more than 150 African Americans in Jackson County, Florida, and hundreds more in other counties, including Madison, Alachua, Columbia, and Hamilton. Florida Freedman's Bureau records provided a detailed recounting of Klansmen's beatings and murders of freedman and their white allies.

The Klan operated with "armed guerilla warfare" that "killed thousands of Negros". Some of the tactics included shooting into houses and burning them "sometimes with...occupants still inside", driving "black farmers off their land", and staging political riots. The results were always certain as "ten to one hundred times as many Negros were killed as whites." Milder encounters, including some against white teachers, occurred. In Mississippi, one example involved Miss Allen of Illinois, who was visited by "about fifty men mounted and disguised" who "treated her gentlemanly and quietly" as they complained about the "heavy school-tax"; they said that "she must stop teaching and go away" and warned that "they never gave a second notice", leading to her "heed[ing] the warning" and leaving the United States.

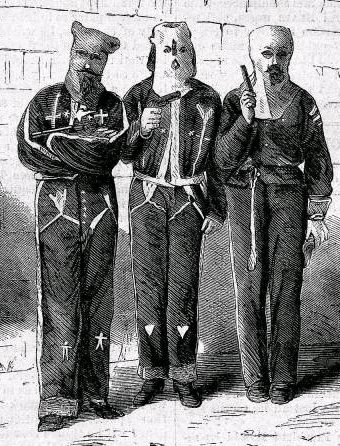
Three Ku Klux Klan members arrested in Tishomingo County, Mississippi, September 1871, for the attempted murder of an entire family.

===== Adopting masks =====
Since the South was heavily rural and people knew each other by their voices and mannerisms, Klan members adopted masks and robes to hide their identities. Since members were afraid or ashamed of doing this openly, "they accomplish[ed] secretly, masked, and at night." The night riders claimed to "be ghosts of Confederate soldiers ... to frighten superstitious blacks" but "few freedmen" took that seriously.

===== Suppressing the vote =====
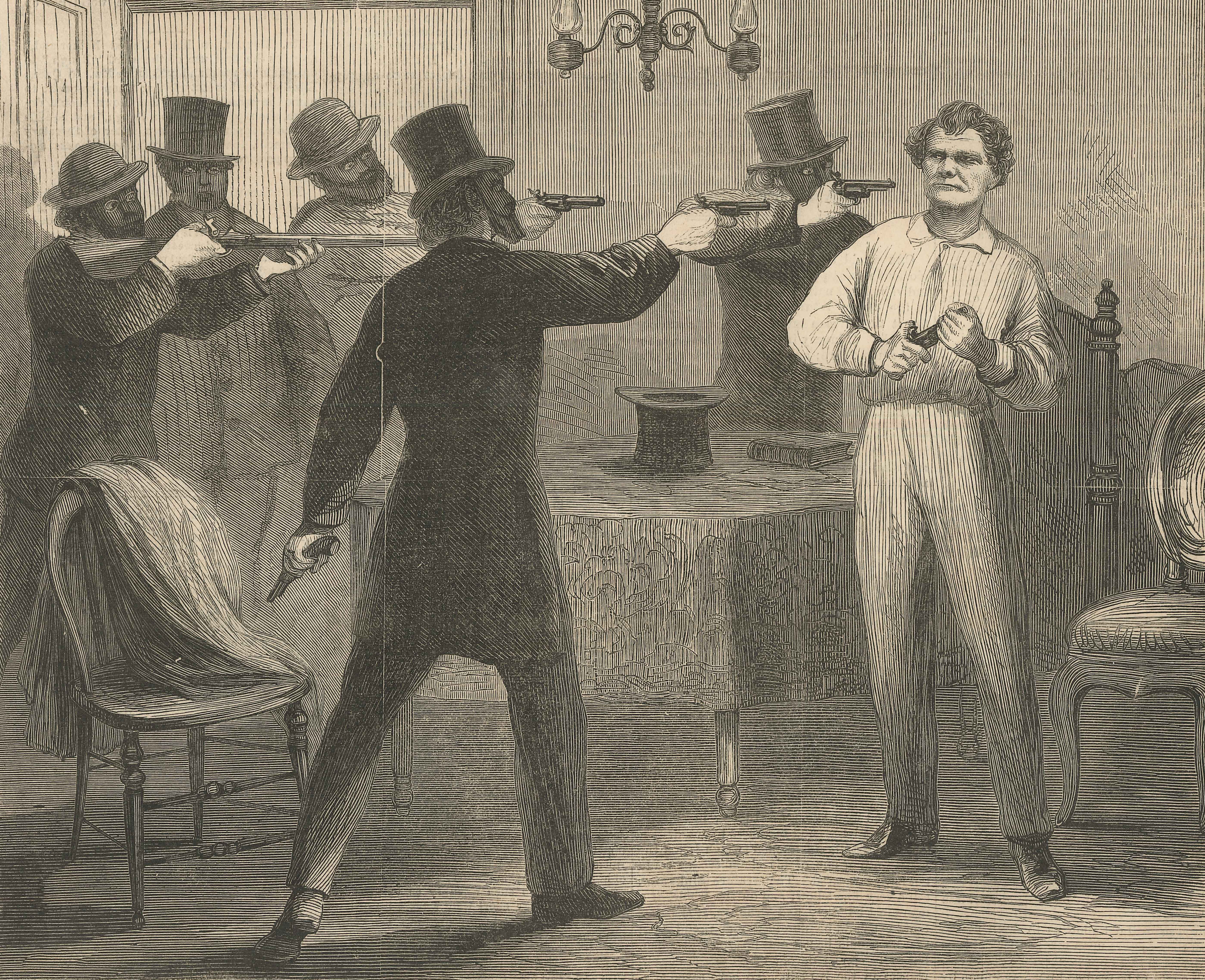
George W. Ashburn was assassinated for his pro-black sentiments.

Klan violence worked to suppress black voting, and campaign seasons were deadly. More than 2,000 people were killed, wounded, or otherwise injured in Louisiana within a few weeks prior to the presidential election of November 1868. Although St. Landry Parish had a registered Republican majority of 1,071, after the murders no Republicans voted in the fall elections. White Democrats cast the full vote of the parish for President Grant's opponent. The KKK killed and wounded more than 200 black Republicans, hunting and chasing them through the woods. Thirteen captives were taken from jail and shot; a half-buried pile of 25 bodies was found in the woods. The KKK made people vote Democratic and gave them certificates of the fact. In the April 1868 Georgia gubernatorial election, Columbia County cast 1,222 votes for Republican Rufus Bullock. By the November presidential election, Klan intimidation led to suppression of the Republican vote, and only one person voted for Ulysses S. Grant.

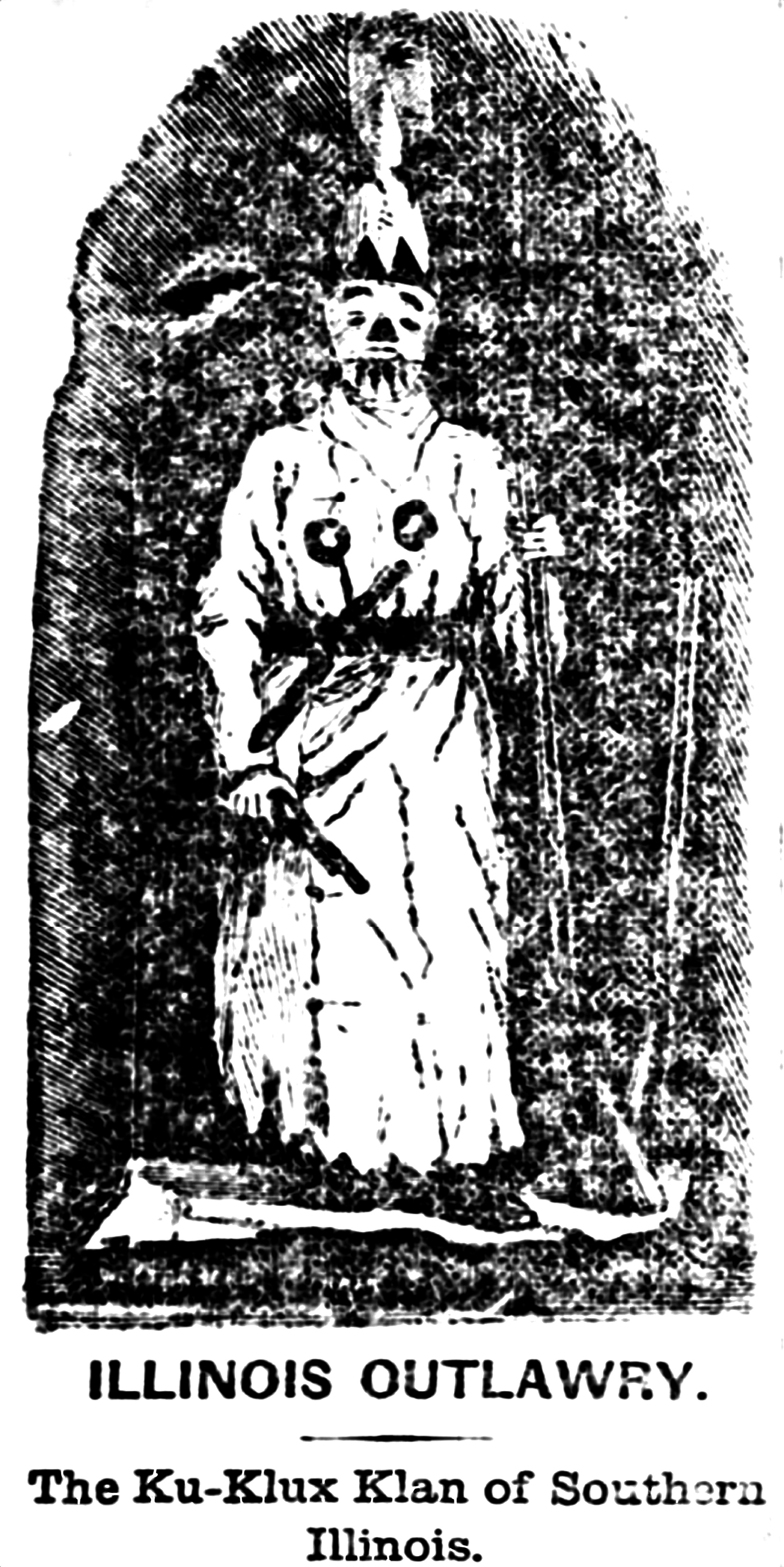
Garb and weapons of the Ku Klux Klan in Southern Illinois, as posed for Joseph A. Dacus of the Missouri Republican, in August 1875.

===== Decrease in activity =====
By 1868, two years after the Klan's creation, its activity was beginning to decrease. Klan members hid behind masks and robes to avoid prosecution for freelance violence. Many influential Southern Democrats feared that Klan lawlessness provided an excuse for the federal government to retain its power over the South, and they began to turn against it. There were outlandish claims made, such as Georgian B. H. Hill stating, "that some of these outrages were actually perpetrated by the political friends of the parties slain."

==== Resistance ====
Union Army veterans in mountainous Blount County, Alabama, organized "the anti-Ku Klux". They curtailed local violence by threatening Klansmen with reprisals unless they stopped whipping Unionists and burning black churches and schools. Armed black people formed their own defense in Bennettsville, South Carolina, and patrolled the streets to protect their homes. While national sentiment rose against the Klan, it was "still regarded as something of a joke". In line with this view, Southern conservative newspapers and the Northern Democratic papers blamed these Southern atrocities on Radical Republicans, alleging that attempts were being made to "hide Radical Rottenness behind a cloud of Ku-Klux" and deriding this concern as "Ku-Klux fever", a supposed conspiracy to swell Republican power. National Democrats further claimed that it was "unnecessary to legislate against a myth" and argued that Republicans were using this issue to manufacture "an emotional issue for the 1870 campaigns" and were "waving the bloody shirt". Amid this controversy, several Southern states began to pass anti-Klan legislation.

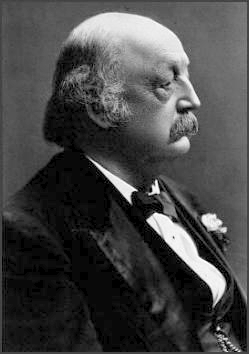
Benjamin Butler wrote the Civil Rights Act of 1871.

In January 1871, Pennsylvania Republican senator John Scott convened a congressional committee that took extensive testimony from witnesses about Klan atrocities, producing multiple volumes of evidence. In February, former Union general and Massachusetts congressman Benjamin Butler introduced the Civil Rights Act of 1871 (Ku Klux Klan Act). This further increased the enmity that Southern white Democrats bore toward him. While the bill was being considered, further violence in the South swung support for its passage. The governor of South Carolina appealed for federal troops to assist his efforts in keeping control of the state. A riot and massacre occurred in a courthouse in Meridian, Mississippi, from which a black state representative escaped by fleeing to the woods. The 1871 Civil Rights Act allowed the president to suspend habeas corpus, which caused uproar among some newspapers and Democrats, who claimed that this centralized presidential power, trampled on the Constitution, that federal intervention was what caused the violence, and that it would "make twenty Ku-Klux where there is now one".

In 1871, President Ulysses S. Grant signed Butler's legislation. The Ku Klux Klan Act and the Enforcement Act of 1870 were used by the federal government to enforce civil rights provisions for individuals under the Constitution. The Klan refused to voluntarily dissolve after the 1871 Klan Act, so President Grant issued a suspension of habeas corpus and stationed federal troops in nine South Carolina counties by invoking the Insurrection Act of 1807. The Klansmen were apprehended and prosecuted in federal court. Judges Hugh Lennox Bond and George S. Bryan presided over South Carolina Ku Klux Klan Trials in Columbia, S.C., during December 1871. The defendants were given from three months to five years of incarceration, along with fines. More black people served on juries in federal court than on local or state juries, so they had a chance to participate in the process. Hundreds of Klan members were fined or imprisoned during the crackdown, "once the national government became set upon a policy of military intervention whole populations which had scouted the authority of the weak 'Radical' government of the State became meek."

==== End and demise of the first Klan ====
Klan leader Nathan Bedford Forrest boasted that the Klan was a nationwide organization of 550,000 men and that he could muster 40,000 Klansmen within five days’ notice. However, the Klan had no membership rosters, no formal chapters, and no local officers, making it difficult for observers to determine its actual size. It created a sensation through the dramatic nature of its masked forays and the large number of murders attributed to its members.

In the early 1870s, federal grand juries issued hundreds of indictments against alleged Klan members for crimes of violence and terrorism. Klan members were prosecuted, and many fled from areas that were under federal government jurisdiction, particularly in South Carolina. Many people not formally inducted into the Klan used the Klan's costume to hide their identities when carrying out independent acts of violence. Forrest called for the Klan to disband in 1869, arguing that it was "being perverted from its original honorable and patriotic purposes, becoming injurious instead of subservient to the public peace". Historian Stanley Horn argues that "generally speaking, the Klan's end was more in the form of spotty, slow, and gradual disintegration than a formal and decisive disbandment". A Georgia-based reporter wrote in 1870: "A true statement of the case is not that the Ku Klux are an organized band of licensed criminals, but that men who commit crimes call themselves Ku Klux".

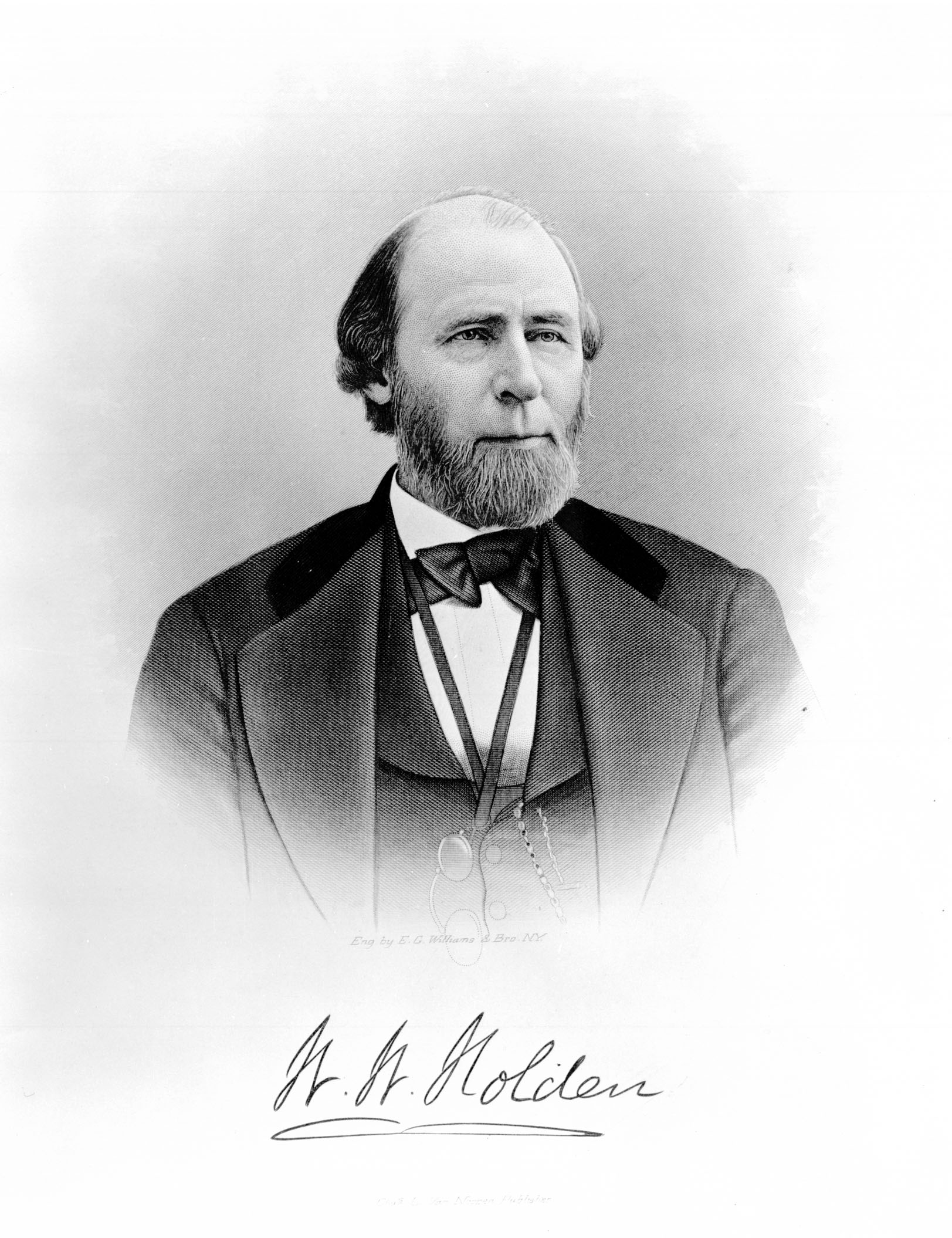
Gov. William Holden of North Carolina

In many states, officials were reluctant to use black militia against the Klan out of fear that racial tensions would be raised. Republican governor of North Carolina William Woods Holden called out the militia against the Klan in 1870, adding to his unpopularity. This, together with extensive violence and fraud at the polls, caused the Republicans to lose their majority in the state legislature. Disaffection with Holden's actions contributed to white Democratic legislators impeaching him and removing him from office, although their reasons for doing so were numerous. Klan operations ended in South Carolina and gradually withered away throughout the rest of the South. Attorney General Amos Tappan Ackerman led the prosecutions. Historian Eric Foner argues that by 1872, the federal government's "evident willingness to bring its legal and coercive authority" broke "the Klan's back" and "produced a dramatic decline in violence" in the South, ending the "Reconstruction career of the Ku Klux Klan"; the Klan was damaged and splintered as an organization. Klan costumes—regalia—disappeared from use by the early 1870s, as Forrest had others destroy them as part of the disbandment.

New groups of insurgents emerged in the mid-1870s, local paramilitary organizations such as the White League, Red Shirts, saber clubs, and rifle clubs, that intimidated and murdered black political leaders. The White League and Red Shirts were distinguished by their willingness to cultivate publicity, working directly to overturn Republican officeholders and regain control of politics. In 1882, the Supreme Court ruled in United States v. Harris that the Klan Act was partially unconstitutional. It held that Congress's power under the Fourteenth Amendment did not include the authority to regulate purely private conspiracies, leaving persons who had been victimized to seek relief in state courts, which were generally unsympathetic to such appeals.

=== Second Klan: 1915–1944 ===
==== Reinitiation and reinstitution ====
In 1915, the film The Birth of a Nation was released, mythologizing and glorifying the first Klan and its activities. The second Ku Klux Klan was founded later that year by William Joseph Simmons, an itinerant Methodist preacher and effective speaker, at Stone Mountain near Atlanta, with fifteen "charter members". At the mountain, he "built an altar on which he placed an American flag, a Bible and an unsheathed sword", then "set fire to a crude wooden cross" and "muttered a few incantations about a 'practical fraternity among men'"; afterward, he "declared himself Imperial Wizard of the Invisible Empire of the Knights of the Ku Klux Klan." The second Klan's growth was based on a new anti-immigrant, anti-Catholic, Prohibitionist, and anti-Semitic agenda that reflected contemporary social tensions, particularly those associated with recent immigration. The new organization and chapters adopted regalia featured in The Birth of a Nation, and members wore masks in public to conceal their identities.

===== The Birth of a Nation =====
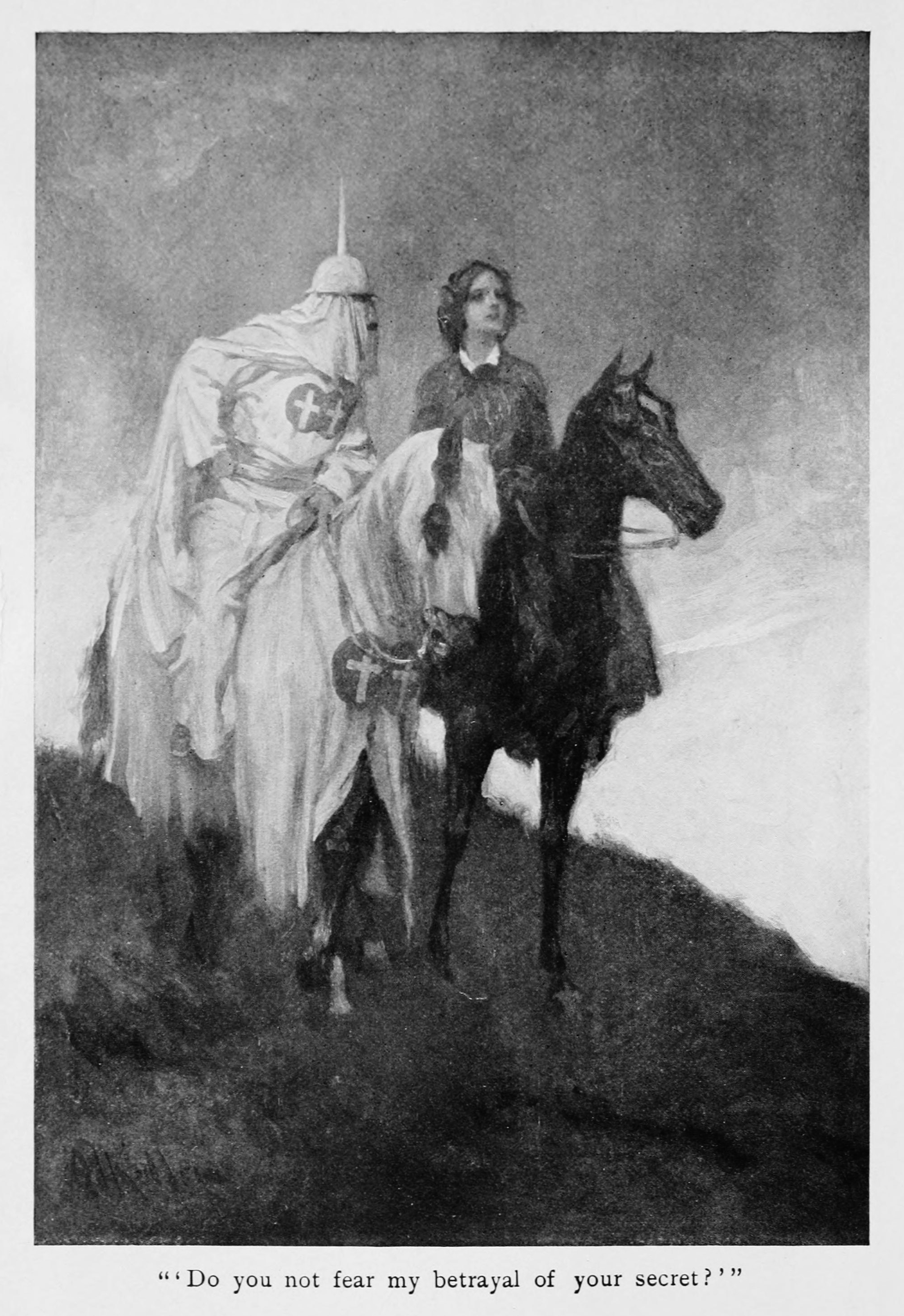
Frontispiece to the first edition of Dixon's The Clansman, by Arthur I. Keller

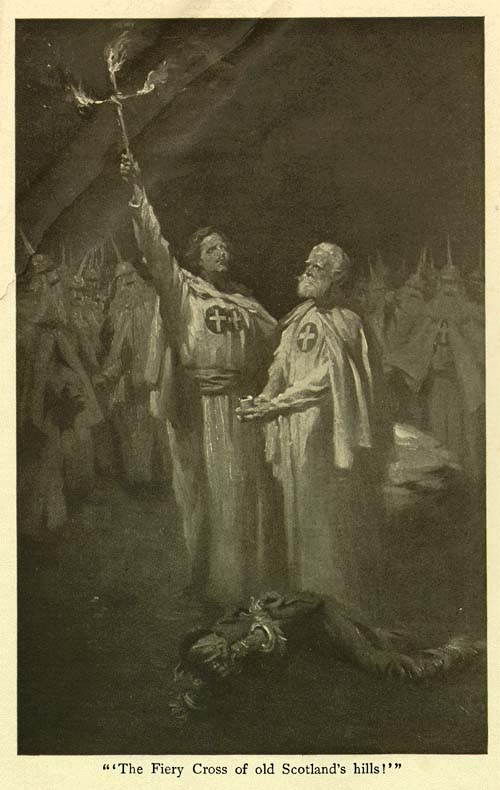
"The Fiery Cross of old Scotland's hills!" Illustration from the first edition of The Clansman, by Arthur I. Keller. Note figures in background.

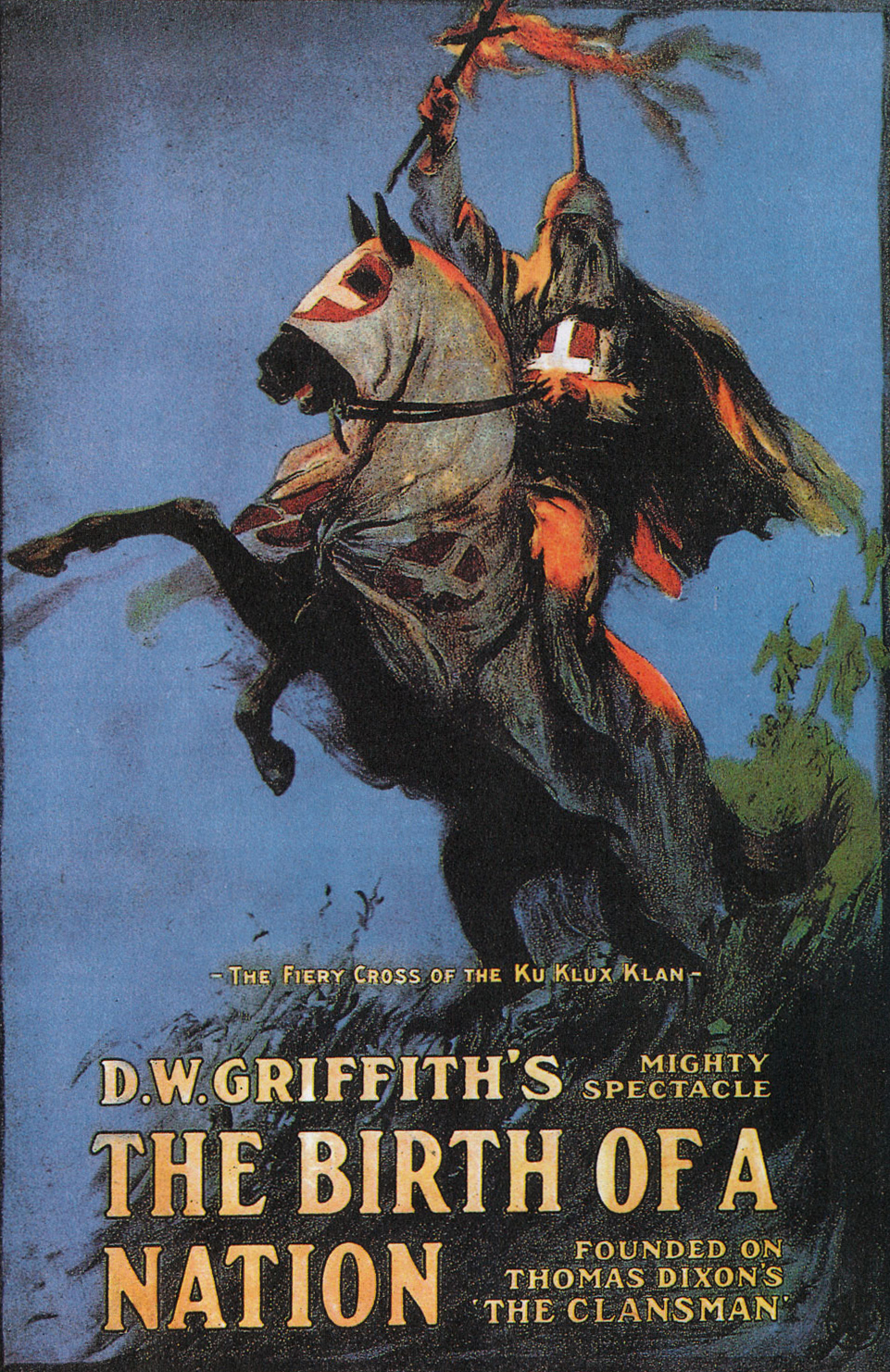
Movie poster for The Birth of a Nation, which has been widely credited with inspiring the 20th-century revival of the Ku Klux Klan

Director D. W. Griffith's The Birth of a Nation glorified the original Klan. The film was based on the book and play The Clansman: A Historical Romance of the Ku Klux Klan, as well as the book The Leopard's Spots, both by Thomas Dixon Jr. Much of the modern Klan's iconography is derived from it, including the standardized white costume and the burning cross. Its imagery drew on Dixon's romanticized concept of old England and Scotland, as portrayed in the novels and poetry of Sir Walter Scott. The film's influence was amplified by an alleged claim of endorsement by President Woodrow Wilson. Dixon was an old friend of Wilson's and, before its release, there was a private showing of the film at the White House. A publicist claimed that Wilson said, "It is like writing history with lightning, and my only regret is that it is all so terribly true." The likelihood of him saying this is doubtful, and he later issued a statement distancing himself from the film and criticizing its use of his writings following protests.

==== Goals ====
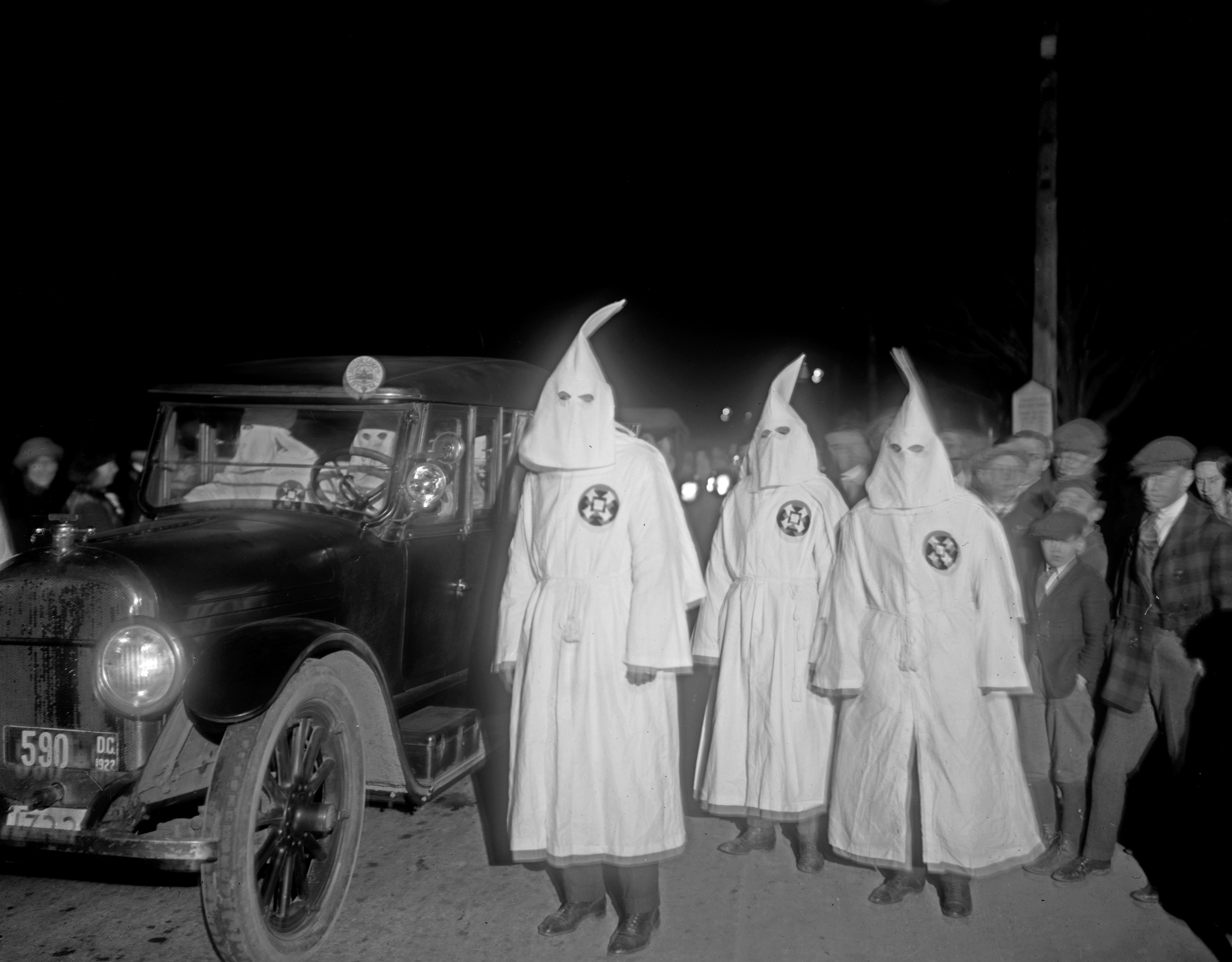
Three Ku Klux Klan members at a 1922 parade

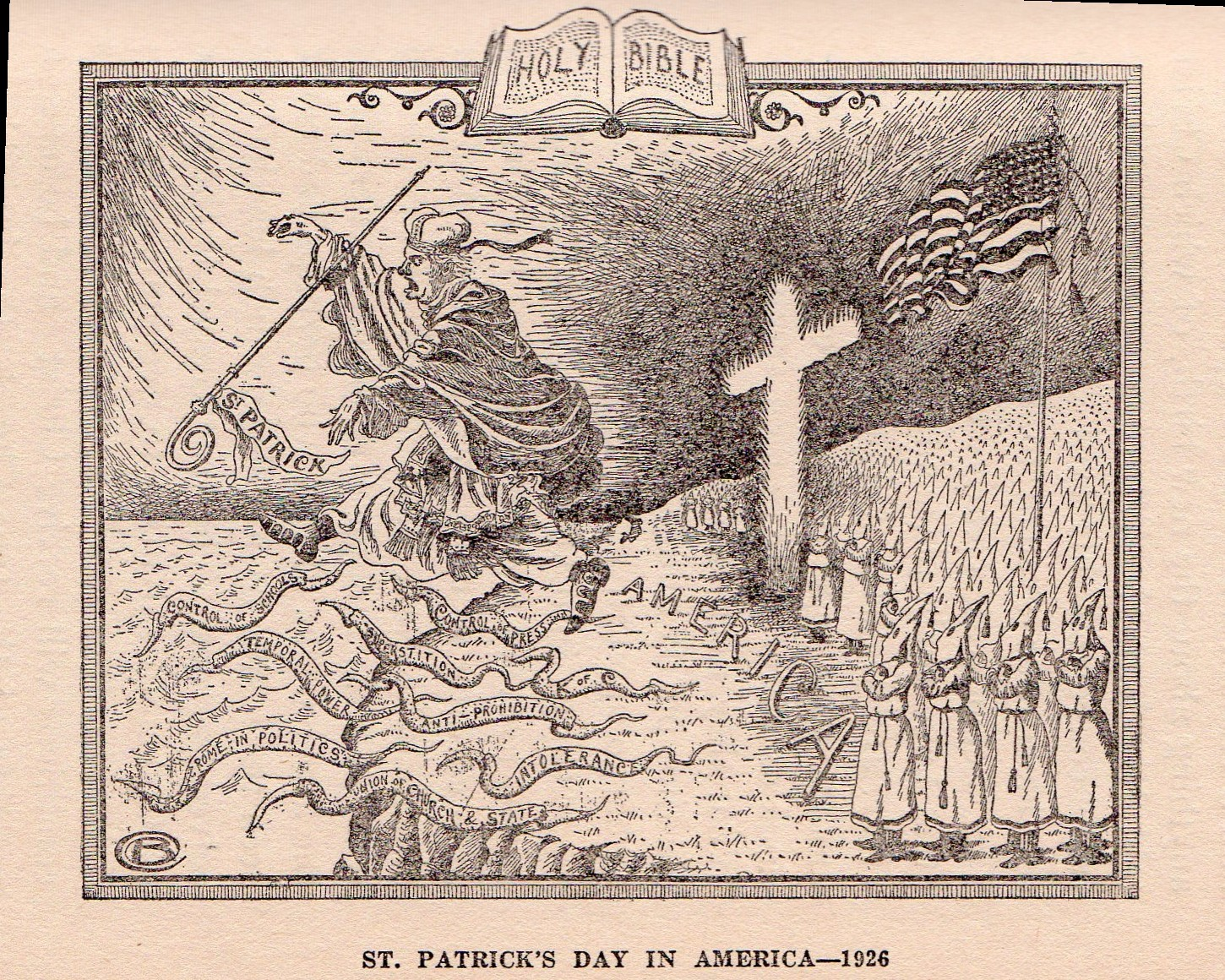
In this 1926 cartoon, the Ku Klux Klan chases the Catholic Church, personified by St. Patrick, from the shores of America. Among the "snakes" are various supposed negative attributes of the Church, including superstition, the union of church and state, control of public schools, and intolerance.

The first and third Klans were primarily active in the Southeastern United States and focused on enforcing white supremacy, especially against black people. The second Klan, in contrast, broadened its appeal to people in the Midwestern and Western states who considered Catholics, Jews, and foreign-born minorities to be anti-American.

The second Klan saw perceived threats from multiple directions. According to historian Brian R. Farmer, "two-thirds of the national Klan lecturers were Protestant ministers". Much of the Klan's rhetoric emphasized guarding the home, and historian Kathleen Bee notes that its member sought to protect "the interests of white womanhood". Simmons published the pamphlet ABC of the Invisible Empire in Atlanta in 1917; in it, he identified the Klan's goals as "to shield the sanctity of the home and the chastity of womanhood; to maintain white supremacy; to teach and faithfully inculcate a high spiritual philosophy through an exalted ritualism; and by a practical devotedness to conserve, protect and maintain the distinctive institutions, rights, privileges, principles and ideals of a pure Americanism".

Such moral-sounding purposes underlay its appeal as a fraternal organization, and it recruited members in rapidly growing cities such as Dallas and Detroit. Owing to a mass influx of immigrants and African Americans, the spread of anti-Catholic groups and religious intolerance, and intensifying class conflict, Detroit was the "unquestioned center of Klan strength", as "approximately half the Wolverine's 70,000 Klansmen resided in Detroit." In the case of Dallas, there were deep-rooted "fear of the Catholic Church" and "immigrant hordes" among "the Southern Protestants", and it was the "financial and fashion capital of the Southwest", offering a strategic location. It was believed in Dallas that "one in three men in the city were members of the white supremacist group." During the 1930s, particularly after James A. Colescott of Indiana became imperial wizard, opposition to communism became another primary aim of the Klan.

==== Organization ====
New Klan founder William J. Simmons joined 12 different fraternal organizations and recruited for the Klan with his chest covered with fraternal badges—modeling the Klan after fraternal organizations. Klan organizers, called "kleagles", signed up hundreds of new members, who paid initiation fees and received costumes in return. The organizer kept half the money and sent the rest to officials. When the organizer was done with an area, he organized a rally, often with burning crosses, perhaps presented a Bible to a local Protestant preacher, and left with the money collected. The local chapters operated like many fraternal organizations and occasionally brought in speakers.

Simmons initially met with little success in recruiting members or raising money, and the Klan remained a small operation in the Atlanta area until 1920. The group produced publications for national circulation from its headquarters in Atlanta: Searchlight (1919–1924), Imperial Night-Hawk (1923–1924), and The Kourier.

==== Perceived moral threats ====
The second Klan was a response to fears regarding the growing power of Catholics and American Jews and the accompanying proliferation of non-Protestant cultural values. The Klan had a nationwide reach by the mid-1920s, with its densest per capita membership in Indiana. It became most prominent in cities with high growth rates between 1910 and 1930, as rural Protestants flocked to jobs in Detroit and Dayton in the Midwest, and Atlanta, Dallas, Memphis, and Houston in the South.

Members swore to uphold American values and Protestantism, and some Protestant ministers became involved at the local level. However, no major Protestant denomination officially endorsed the KKK; the Klan was repeatedly denounced by the major Protestant magazines, as well as by all major secular newspapers. It was supported by one small cult, the Pillar of Fire Church controlled by bishop Alma Bridwell White, but she said she and her followers did not belong to the Klan. Historian Robert Moats Miller reported that "not a single endorsement was found by the present writer in the Methodist press" and Klan attacks in the media "were quite savage", as the Southern Baptist press condoned their "aims but condemned the methods." National denomination organizations never endorsed the Klan, but they rarely condemned it by name. Many nationally and regionally prominent churchmen did condemn it by name, and none endorsed it.

Historians agree that the Klan's resurgence in the 1920s was aided by the national debate over Prohibition. Historian Prendergast states that the KKK's "support for Prohibition represented the single most important bond between Klansmen throughout the nation". The Klan opposed bootleggers, sometimes using violence. In 1922, two hundred Klan members set fire to saloons in Union County, Arkansas. Membership in the Klan and in other Prohibition groups overlapped, and they sometimes coordinated their activities.

==== Violence ====
The second Klan was less violent than either the first or third Klans. Yet, the second Klan, especially in the Southeast, was not an entirely non-violent organization; the most violent Klan activity was in Dallas, Texas. In April 1921, several members of the Klan kidnapped Alex Johnson, a black man who had been accused of having sex with a white woman, burning the letters "KKK" into his forehead and giving him a severe beating by a riverbed. The police chief and district attorney refused to prosecute, publicly stating they believed that Johnson deserved this treatment. Reassured, Klansmen in Dallas whipped 68 people by the riverbed in 1922 alone. However, most of the Dallas KKK's whipping victims were white men accused of offenses against their wives—adultery, wife beating, abandonment, refusal to pay child support, or gambling.

Klansmen often invited local newspaper reporters to attend their whipping so that they could write a story about them in the next day's newspaper. All the Dallas newspapers strongly condemned the Klan. Historians report that the Morning News "diligently published thousands of anti-Klan editorials, exposés, and critical stories, informing its readership of Klan activities in their community as well as from around the state and the nation."

The Alabama KKK whipped both white and black women who were accused of fornication or adultery. Although many people in Alabama were outraged by the whippings of white women, no Klansmen were ever convicted for the violence. Anti-Catholicism was a main concern of the Alabama Klan, and Hugo Black built his political career in the 1920s on fighting Catholicism. Black, a Democrat, went on to the U.S. Senate and the U.S. Supreme Court.

==== Rapid growth and marketing ====
In 1920, Simmons handed the day-to-day activities of the national office to two professional publicists, Elizabeth Tyler and Edward Young Clarke. The new leadership invigorated the Klan, and it grew rapidly. It appealed to new members by drawing on contemporary social tensions and emphasized responses to fears raised by the defiance of Prohibition and changing sexual norms. It promoted anti-Jewish, anti-Catholic, anti-immigrant, and later anti-communist positions. The organization presented itself as a fraternal, nativist, and strongly patriotic body, and its leaders stressed support for vigorous enforcement of Prohibition law. Membership expanded dramatically, reaching a peak by 1924 that is commonly estimated at between 1.5 million to 4 million, or roughly 4–15% of the eligible population, mainly based on the Klan's own claims. In Indiana, which had the highest reported Klan penetration, there were 162,267 members, or "18.44% of the eligible Indiana population"; applying those numbers to the entire United States yields an "upper bound of 5.2 million Klan members".

By the 1920s, most members lived in the Midwest and West. Nearly one in five of the eligible Indiana population (18.44%) were members. The Klan had a national base by 1925. In the South, where the great majority of whites were Democrats, most Klansmen were Democrats. In the rest of the country, the membership comprised Republicans, Democrats, and independents. Klan leaders tried to infiltrate political parties; as Cummings notes, "it was non-partisan in the sense that it pressed its nativist issues to both parties". Sociologist Rory McVeigh has explained the Klan's strategy in appealing to members of both parties:

Klan leaders hope to have all major candidates competing to win the movement's endorsement. ... The Klan's leadership wanted to keep their options open and repeatedly announced that the movement was not aligned with any political party. This non-alliance strategy was also valuable as a recruiting tool. The Klan drew its members from Democratic as well as Republican voters. If the movement had aligned itself with a single political party, it would have substantially narrowed its pool of potential recruits.

Religion was a major selling point. Kelly J. Baker argues that Klansmen seriously embraced Protestantism as an essential component of their white supremacist, anti-Catholic, and paternalistic formulation of American democracy and national culture. Their cross functioned as a religious symbol, and their ritual honored Bibles and local ministers. As part of positioning themselves within the nation's religious landscape, the Klan also "launched campaigns to unify Protestants across denominal lines in its effort to save America from immigration and 'other evils'" and maintained a "requirement of church membership in a Protestant denomination" with a "centrality of churchgoing in print". In this framework, the Klan was not merely just a "marginal movement of reactionaries" but rather a group whose members sought what they viewed as an "authentic interpretation of Protestantism".

Economists Fryer and Levitt argue that the rapid growth of the Klan in the 1920s was partly the result of an innovative, multi-level marketing campaign. They also contend that, during this period, the Klan leadership focused more on monetizing the organization than achieving its political goals, and that local leaders profited from expanding their membership. The Klan attracted people but most of them did not remain in the organization for long.

==== Urbanization ====
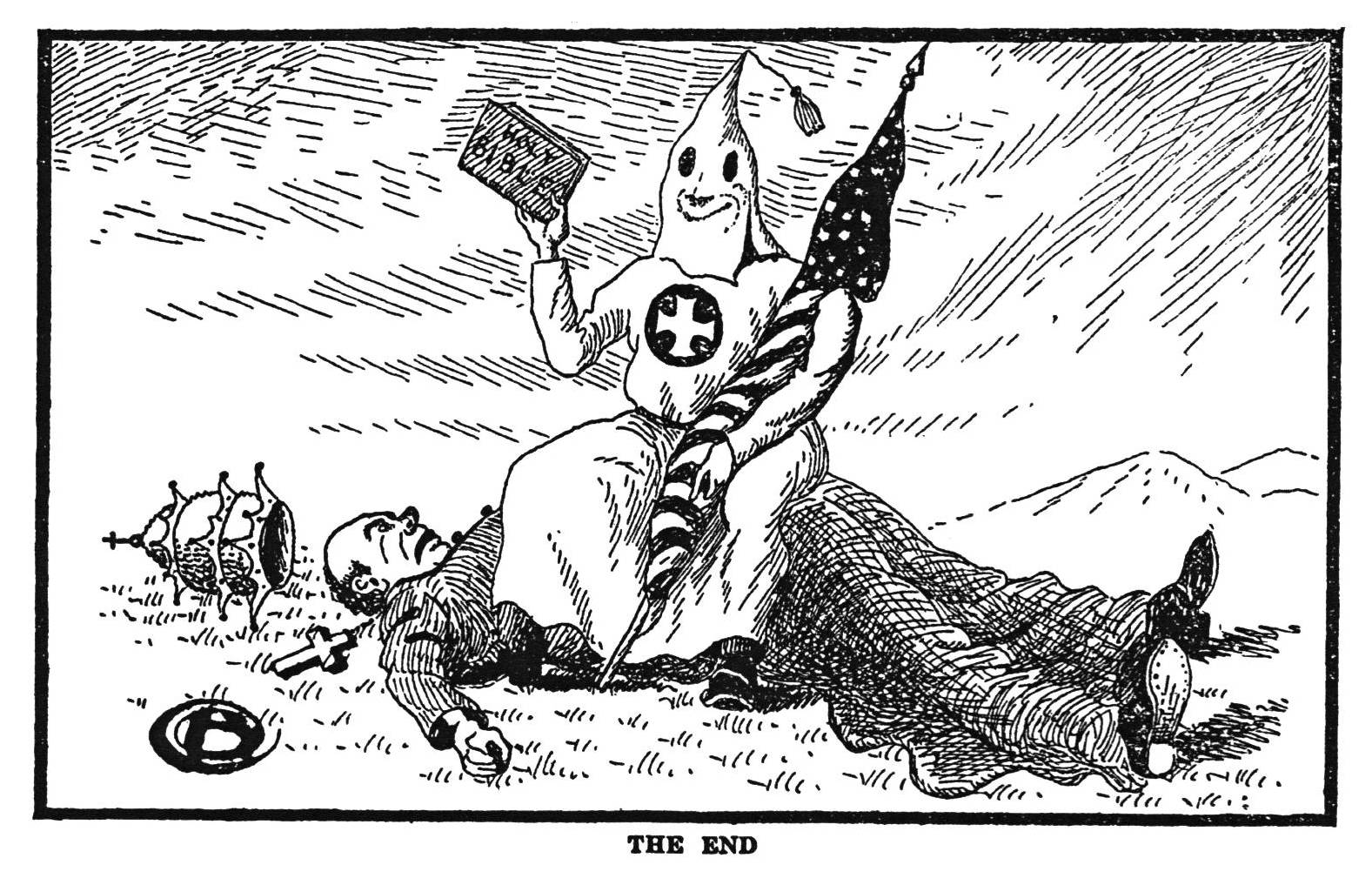
"The End" referring to the end of Catholic influence in the US. Klansmen: Guardians of Liberty 1926

Being based in urban areas, the second Klan reflected the major shifts of the population to cities in the North, West, and the South. In Michigan, for example, 40,000 members lived in Detroit, where they constituted more than half of the state's membership. Most Klansmen were lower- to middle-class white Protestants who feared the influx of newcomers to industrial cities: immigrants from Southern and Eastern Europe, who were predominantly Catholic or Jewish, as well as black and white migrants from the rural South. As new populations moved into cities, rapidly changing neighborhoods generated social tensions. Because of the rapid pace of population growth in industrializing cities such as Detroit and Chicago, the Klan expanded quickly in the Midwest, and it also grew in booming Southern cities such as Dallas and Houston.

In the medium-sized industrial city of Worcester, Massachusetts, in the 1920s, the Klan rose to local prominence but declined as a result of opposition from the Catholic Church. There was no associated violence, and the local newspaper ridiculed Klansmen as "night-shirt knights". About half of the members were Swedish Americans, including some first-generation immigrants. Ethnic and religious conflicts among more recent immigrants contributed to Klan's rise in the city, as Swedish Protestants competed with Irish Catholics—who had been entrenched there longer—for political and ideological influence.

In some states, historians have obtained membership rosters of local units and matched the names against city directories and other records to create statistical profiles of the membership. Big-city newspapers were often hostile and portrayed Klansmen as ignorant farmers. Detailed analysis from Indiana, however, shows that this rural stereotype was inaccurate for that state:

Indiana's Klansmen represented a wide cross section of society: they were not disproportionately urban or rural, nor were they significantly more or less likely than other members of society to be from the working class, middle class, or professional ranks. Klansmen were Protestants, of course, but they cannot be described exclusively or even predominantly as fundamentalists. In reality, their religious affiliations mirrored the whole of white Protestant society, including those who did not belong to any church.

==== Costumes and the burning cross ====
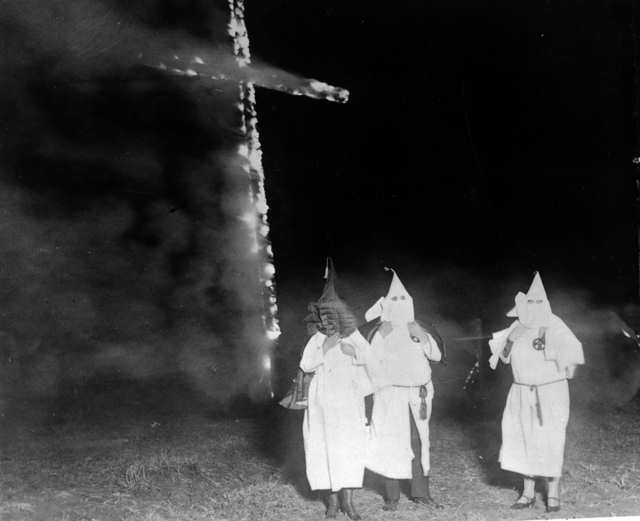
Cross burning was introduced by William J. Simmons, the founder of the second Klan in 1915.

Wearing the distinctive white costumes permitted its members to have large-scale public activities, especially parades and cross-burning ceremonies. Sales of the costumes provided the main financing for the national organization, while initiation fees funded local and state organizers.

The second Klan embraced the burning Latin cross as a dramatic symbol with an intimidating tone. No crosses had been used as a symbol by the first Klan, but it became a symbol of the Klan's quasi-Christian message. Its lighting during meetings was often accompanied by prayer, the singing of hymns, and other overtly religious symbolism. In his novel The Clansman, Thomas Dixon Jr. borrows the idea that the first Klan had used fiery crosses from "the call to arms" of the Scottish Clans, and film director D. W. Griffith used this image in The Birth of a Nation; Simmons adopted the symbol wholesale from the movie, and the symbol and action have been associated with the Klan ever since.

==== Women ====
By the 1920s, the KKK had developed a women's auxiliary, with chapters in many areas. Its activities included participation in parades, cross lightings, lectures, rallies, and boycotts of local businesses owned by Catholics and Jews. The Women's Klan was active in promoting Prohibition, emphasizing liquor's perceived negative impact on wives and children. Its efforts in public schools included distributing Bibles and petitioning for the dismissal of Catholic teachers. Their goals included "outlaw[ing] the Knights of Columbus" due to allegations of taking over the country, "remov[ing] Catholic encyclopedias from public schools", "barr[ing] the use of Catholic contractors by public agencies", and excluding Jewish and Catholic "vacationers in majority-Protestant suburban resorts".

==== Political role ====
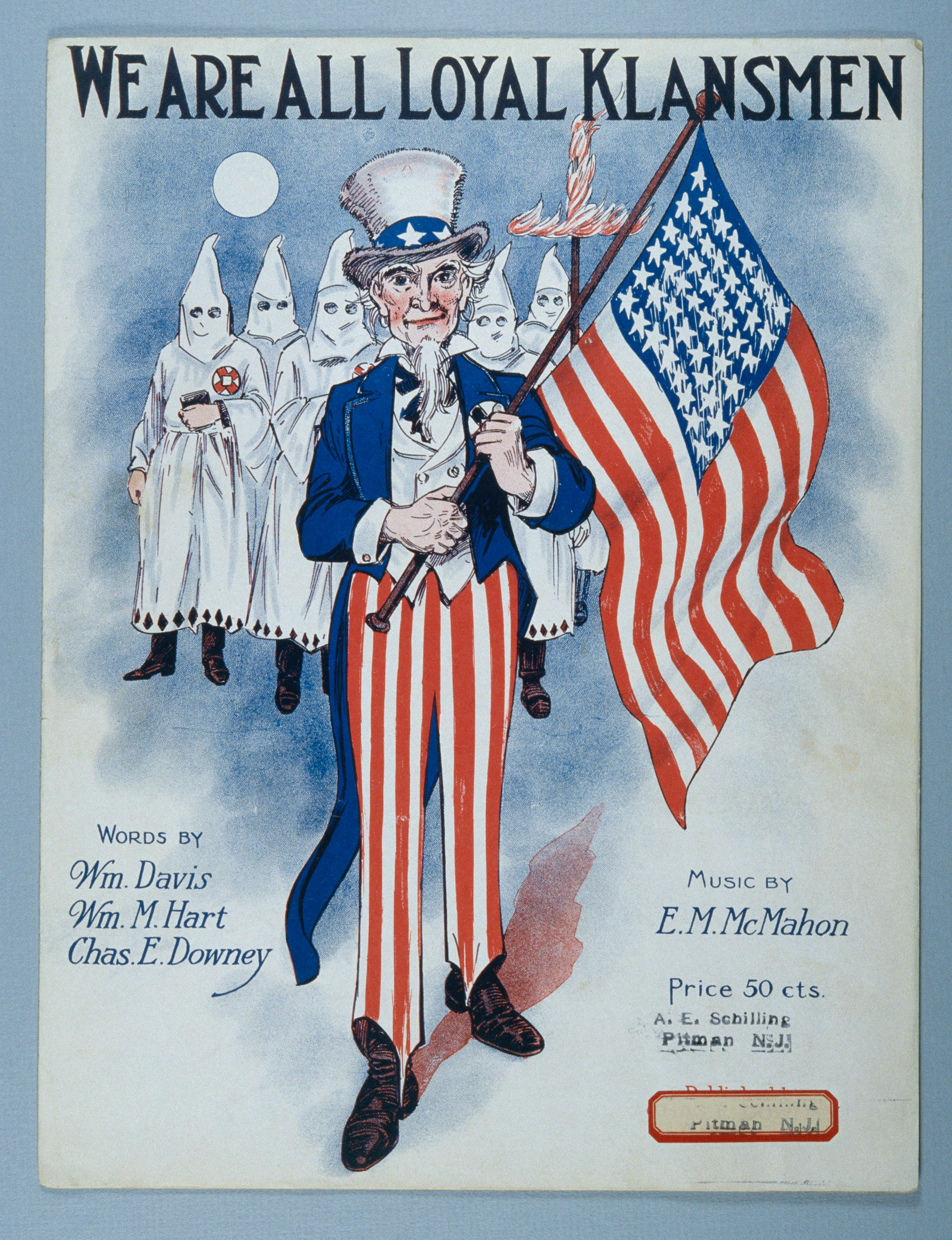
Sheet music to "We Are All Loyal Klansmen", 1923

The second Klan expanded with new chapters in Midwestern and Western cities and recruited Republicans, Democrats, and men without party affiliation. The goal of Prohibition in particular helped the Klan and some Republicans make common cause in the North. The Klan had members in every region of the United States but was especially strong in the South and Midwest. At its peak, claimed Klan membership exceeded four million and, in some broad regions, amounted to about 20% of the adult white male population, reaching as high as 40% in certain areas. In Indiana, members were American-born white Protestants, and it had claimed it had more than 30% of white male Hoosiers as members. In 1924, it supported Republican Edward Jackson in his successful campaign for governor. The Klan moved north into Canada, especially Saskatchewan, where it exercised significant influence within the provincial Conservative party in the 1920s and 1930s.

Catholic and liberal Democrats—who were strongest in northeastern cities—decided to make the Klan an issue at the 1924 Democratic National Convention in New York City. Their delegates proposed a resolution indirectly attacking the Klan; it was defeated by one vote out of 1,100. The leading presidential candidates were William Gibbs McAdoo, a Protestant with a base in the South and West where the Klan was strong, and New York governor Al Smith, a Catholic with a base in the large cities. After weeks of stalemate and bitter argumentation, both candidates withdrew in favor of a compromise candidate. In 1928, Thomas J. Heflin, the junior senator from Alabama, blamed the Democratic loss in the 1924 presidential election on Roman Catholics dividing the party, stating:

What did I see in the [1924 Democratic] convention at New York? I saw Roman Catholic delegates in the corridors of the hotels noisily demanding that the Ku-Klux-Klan be denounced by the Democratic convention. I talked to a number of them. I said, "Gentlemen, that question has got no business in this convention; you may not like the Klan, but you have got no business trying to get a National Democratic Convention to denounce it. It is a Protestant order and Protestants generally think that you want it denounced because you are Catholics. What would you think if it sought to denounce the Knights of Columbus by the convention? Nobody but Catholics can join that order." "No," they replied, "we want the convention to denounce it." I said, "If you do, you will tear the Democratic Party to pieces," and a number of them replied, "To hell with the party if it will not denounce the Klan." So I tell you Senators again that they put Roman Catholic government above everything, above the Democratic Party, and above their country. That is plain talk, but it is the plain truth.

— Thomas J. Heflin, Congressional Record (January 28, 1928), 1st Session, 70th Congress, vol. 69, pt. 2, 1654–55, 1658.

In some states, such as Alabama and California, Klan chapters backed certain political reform efforts. In 1924, Klan members were elected to the city council in Anaheim, California, a city dominated by an entrenched commercial-civil elite that was mostly German American. Given their tradition of moderate social drinking, many German Americans did not strongly support Prohibition—the mayor had been a saloon keeper. Led by the minister of the First Christian Church, the Klan represented a rising group of politically active non-ethnic Germans who denounced the elite as corrupt, undemocratic, and self-serving. Historian Christopher Cocoltchos argues that the Klansmen sought to have a model, orderly community.

The Klan had about 1,200 members in Orange County, California, and the economic and occupational profiles of pro- and anti-Klan groups were similar and about equally prosperous. Klan members were Protestants, as were most of their opponents, but the latter also included many Catholic Germans. Individuals who joined the Klan had previously shown higher rates of voting and civic activism than their opponents, and Cocoltchos suggests that many in Orange County joined out of sense of civic engagement. The Klan slate easily won the local election in Anaheim in April 1924, then dismissed city employees known to be Catholic and replaced them with Klan appointees. The new city council sought stricter enforcement of Prohibition, and the local Klan chapter held large rallies and initiation ceremonies over the summer.

Opponents organized in response, bribed a Klansman for the secret membership list, and exposed Klan-backed candidates in the state primaries, defeating most of them. In 1925, anti-Klan forces regained control of local government and, in a special election, successfully recalled the Klansmen elected in 1924. The Klan in Anaheim quickly collapsed; its newspaper closed after losing a libel suit, and the minister who led the local Klavern moved to Kansas.

In the South, Klan members remained Democrats, as the region was effectively a one-party system for white voters. Local Klan chapters were closely allied with Democratic police, sheriffs, and other officials. Because most African Americans and many poor whites had been disenfranchised around the start of the 20th century, meaningful electoral competition for whites occurred only within the Democratic Party.

In Alabama, Klan members advocated better public schools, stricter Prohibition enforcement, expanded road construction, and other measures they believed would benefit lower-class white people. By 1925, the Klan was a significant political force in the state, as leaders such as J. Thomas Heflin, David Bibb Graves, and Hugo Black sought to build political power against the Black Belt planter elite, which had long dominated state policies. In 1926, with Klan support, Bibb Graves—himself a former Klan chapter head—was elected governor. He promoted increased education funding, improved public health, new highway construction, and some pro-labor legislation. However, because the Alabama legislature refused to redistrict until 1972 (and then only under court order), the Klan was unable to dislodge the planters’ and rural areas’ entrenched control of legislative power.

Scholars and biographers have closely examined Hugo Black's Klan involvement. Ball concludes that Black "sympathized with the group's economic, nativist, and anti-Catholic beliefs". Newman notes that Black "disliked the Catholic Church as an institution" and delivered over 100 anti-Catholic speeches to KKK meetings across Alabama during his 1926 campaign. Black was elected U.S. senator that year as a Democrat. In 1937, President Franklin D. Roosevelt appointed him to the Supreme Court without knowing the full extent of his earlier Klan activity. The Senate confirmed him before his complete KKK connection became public; Black later stated that he left the Klan when he entered the Senate.

Although the KKK has generally been viewed as anti-labor, historian Thomas R. Pegram writes that "local Klans supported striking white Protestant workers" while opposing interracial unions, and that working-class Klan sympathies "complicated urban socialist politics in the Midwest".

==== Resistance and decline ====
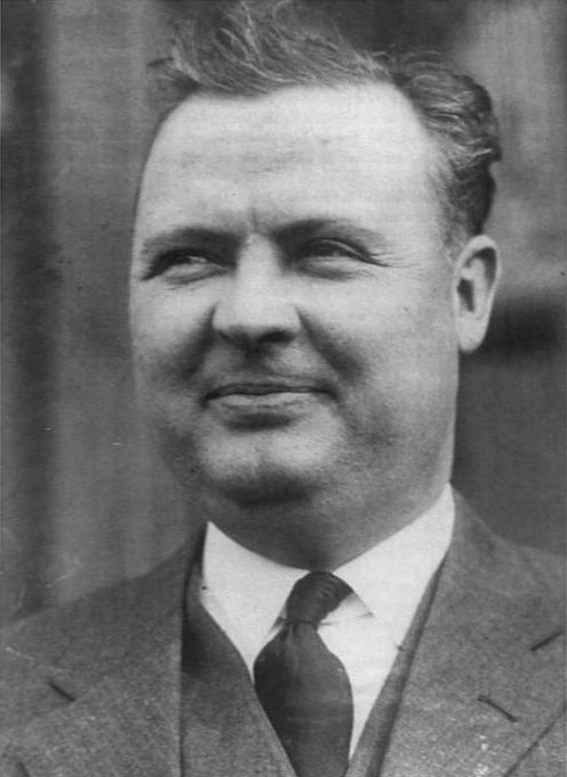
D. C. Stephenson, Grand Dragon of the Indiana Klan. His conviction in 1925 for the murder of Madge Oberholtzer, a white schoolteacher, led to the decline of the Indiana Klan.

Many groups and leaders, including prominent Protestant ministers such as Reinhold Niebuhr, the Jewish Anti-Defamation League of B'nai B'rith (now the Anti-Defamation League (ADL), the National Association for the Advancement of Colored People (NAACP), and local civic organizations, spoke out and organized against the Klan, gaining national attention. After its peak in 1925, Klan membership in most areas began to decline rapidly, in part because of these campaigns, as well as ineffective leadership and the exposure of abuses by the national organization.

The Jewish Anti-Defamation League of B'nai B'rith, founded in the early 20th century in response to attacks on Jewish Americans—including the lynching of Leo Frank in Atlanta—opposed the Klan's campaign to prohibit private schools, a measure aimed chiefly at Catholic parochial institutions. Other organizations worked to expose the Klan's secrecy; in Indiana, the publication of membership lists by a civic group contributed to a rapid decline in local enrollment. The NAACP conducted public education campaigns about Klan activities and lobbied Congress against Klan abuses.

Beyond external organizations attacking them, internal struggles suffocated the Klan. As an example, in Indiana, the scandal surrounding the 1925 murder trial of Grand Dragon D.C. Stephenson shattered the Klan's image as an upholder of law and order; by 1926, the group became "crippled and discredited". Stephenson, who had led Indiana and 22 northern states and had broken with the national Klan in 1923, was convicted of second-degree murder for his role in the rape and subsequent death of his former aide, Madge Oberholtzer. His conviction precipitated a dramatic collapse of the Klan in Indiana.

Historian Leonard Moore attributes the Klan's collapse to failures in leadership; Stephenson and the other salesmen "lacked both the ability and the desire to use the political system" for goals of the Klan, arguing that the Klan for them was "nothing more than a means for gaining wealth and power". Due to internal corruption and crimes tainting the movement, those concerned with their political goals and futures "had even less reason to work on the Klan's behalf" and it also "never required strong, dedicated leadership" until it "became a political force".

In Alabama, Klan vigilantes begun a wave of violence in 1927, targeting both black and white residents for perceived violations of racial norms and moral standards. This provoked backlash that begun in the press. Grover C. Hall Sr., editor of the Montgomery Advertiser from 1926, wrote a series of editorials attacking the Klan—what the paper later described as having "waged war on the resurgent [KKK]". In 1928, Hall earned the Pulitzer Prize for Editorial Writing for his "editorials against gangsterism, floggings and racial and religious intolerance". Other newspapers denounced the Klan as violent and "un-American", and law enforcement increased pressure on its activities. In the 1928 presidential election, the state voters overcame their initial opposition to the Catholic candidate Al Smith and voted the Democratic Party line as usual, as "despite Baptists' aversion to Smith's religion, many of them no doubt voted for him." However, in Oklahoma City, the minister of the largest Baptist congregation said, "If you vote for Al Smith you’re voting against Christ and you’ll all be damned."

Although declining, the Klan demonstrated some influence when it staged a march along Pennsylvania Avenue in Washington, D.C., in 1928. Nonetheless, by 1930, Alabama membership had fallen to fewer than 6,000, though small independent units remained active in Birmingham.

Klan groups continued operating in parts of Georgia during the 1930s. In Atlanta, "night riders" enforced their moral cores by flogging individuals—both white and black—accused of violating them. In March 1940, they were implicated in the beating deaths of a young white couple abducted from a lovers' lane, and in the fatal flogging of a white barber for drinking, all in East Point, a suburb of Atlanta. More than 20 others were "brutally flogged". When police began investigating, they discovered that Klan records had disappeared from the East Point office. The cases were reported by the Chicago Tribune, the NAACP's Crisis magazine, and the local newspapers.

=== National changes and historiography ===
Estimated membership statistics
| Year | Membership | References |
|---|---|---|
| 1871 | 550,000 | |
| 1920 | 5,000 | |
| 1925 | 5,000,000 | |
| 1927 | 325,000 | |
| 1930 | 30,000 | |
| 1965 | 42,000 | |
| 1968 | 14,000 | |
| 1970 | 2,000–3,500 | |
| 1974 | 1,500 | |
| 1978 | 9,000 | |
| 1981 | 11,000 | |
| 1990s | 5,000 | |
| 2009 | 5,000–8,000 | |
| 2016 | 3,000 | |

In 1939, after several years of decline brought on by the Great Depression, Imperial Wizard Hiram Wesley Evans sold the national Klan organization to James A. Colescott, an Indiana veterinarian, and Samuel Green, an Atlanta obstetrician. They were unable to reverse the Klan's shrinking membership. In 1944, the Internal Revenue Service filed a lien for $685,000 in back taxes against the organization, and Colescott dissolved the national Klan by decree on April 23 of that year. Many local chapters continued to close years later.

After World War II, American author Stetson Kennedy infiltrated the Klan and provided internal information to journalists and law enforcement agencies. He also supplied secret code words and ritual details to writers of the Superman radio program, leading to episodes in which Superman confronted a thinly disguised version of the Klan. By exposing and trivializing the group's rituals, Kennedy helped undermine its mystique, which may have contributed to declining recruitment and membership. In the 1950s, he published a bestselling book, The Klan Unmasked, further discussing his experiences with the Klan.

The historiography of the second Ku Klux Klan of the 1920s has evolved significantly over time. Early accounts relied primarily on contemporary mainstream sources, but from the late 20th century onward, historians increasingly drew on internal records and local chapter materials to produce social histories that analyze the movement's membership, community roots, and political influence. Historian Craig Fox argues that the second Klan "exercised a particularly compelling allure, its pull reflected in its sheer numerical popularity in towns and cities nationwide", suggesting that "unlike its historical namesakes, the organization involved largely ordinary citizens, from all walks of life" and "dwarfed all other Klan movements". Similarly, Thomas Pegram contends that "many joined the Klan for fraternal and social reasons or to pursue local political issues", reflecting an "intensified expression of widely shared civic and moral values...threatened by dramatic culture change in the aftermath of World War I."

==== Anti-modern interpretations ====
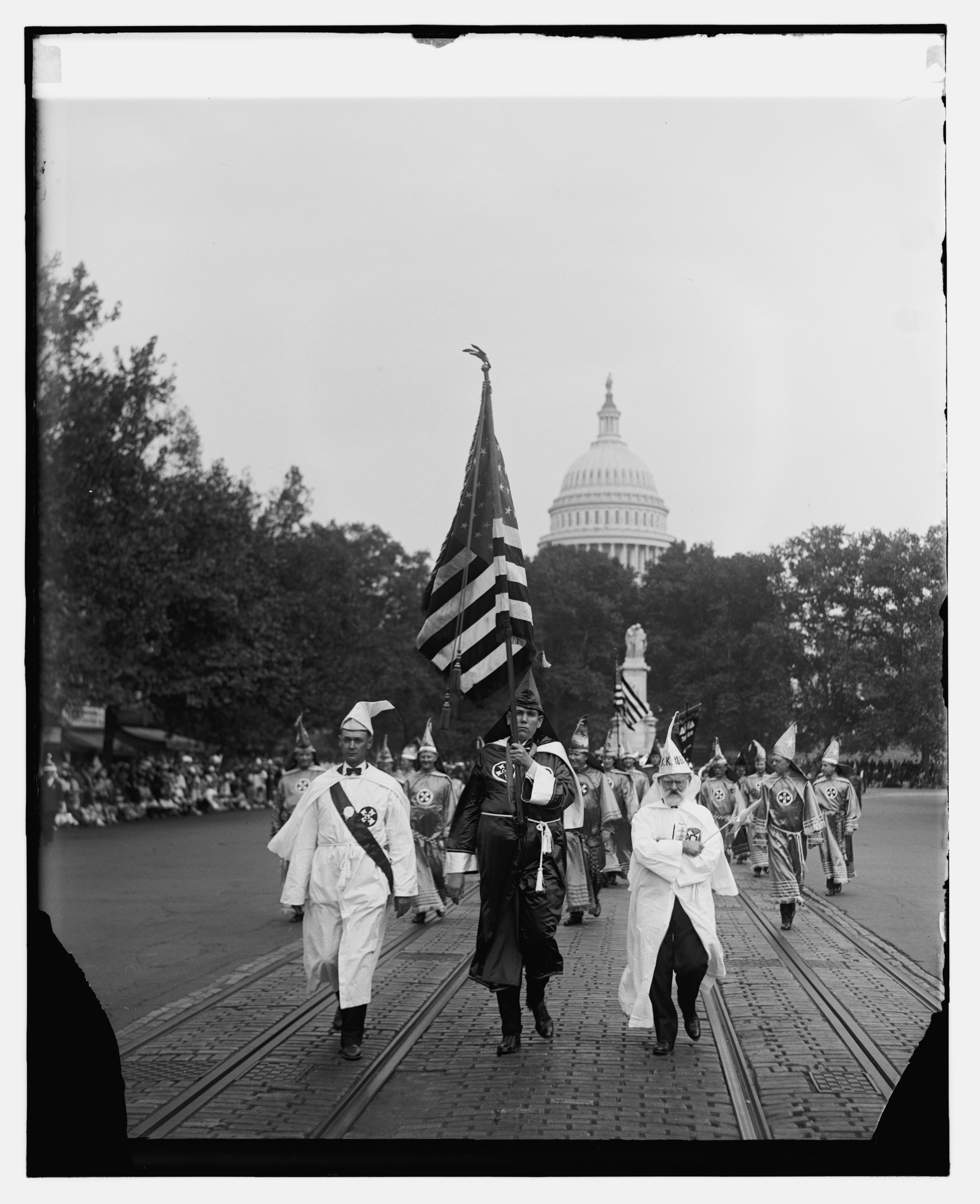
Ku Klux Klan parade in Washington, D.C., September 13, 1926

The Klan was a secret organization; apart from a few top leaders, most members did not publicly identify themselves and wore masks at rallies and parades. Investigators in the 1920s relied on Klan publicity, court cases, exposés by disgruntled members, newspaper reports, and conjecture to describe the organization's activities. Almost all major national newspapers and magazines were hostile to the Klan. Historian Thomas R. Pegram argues that these published accounts tended to exaggerate the official viewpoint of Klan leaders and to repeat the interpretations of hostile newspapers and other opponents. According to Pegram, the resulting popular and scholarly interpretation of the Klan from the 1920s into the mid‑20th century emphasized its Southern roots and its violent, vigilante-style efforts to resist modernity, and scholars often compared it to European fascist movements.

Peter H. Amann states that, "Undeniably, the Klan had some traits in common with European fascism—chauvinism, racism, a mystique of violence, an affirmation of a certain kind of archaic traditionalism—yet their differences were fundamental. ...[The KKK] never envisioned a change of political or economic system." Pegram characterizes this original interpretation as one that "depicted the Klan movement as an irrational rebuke of modernity by undereducated, economically marginal bigots, religious zealots, and dupes" and as viewing the Klan as "a movement of country parsons and small-town malcontents" that were dwarfed with "the dynamism of twentieth-century urban America".

==== New social history interpretations ====
The "social history" turn in historiography from the 1960s onward emphasized history from the bottom up; in the case of the Klan, historians used membership lists and minutes from local chapters across the country to examine the characteristics, beliefs, and behavior of typical members, giving less weight to accounts derived solely from elite or external sources. This research showed that the earlier interpretation was largely mistaken about the Klan's social base and activities: its members were not predominantly anti-modern, rural, or rustic, but were often relatively well-educated, middle-class joiners and community activists. Roughly half of the membership lived in rapidly growing industrial cities, and Chicago, Detroit, Philadelphia, Indianapolis, Denver, and Portland, Oregon, were among the Klan's major strongholds during the 1920s. Pegram concludes that the Klan "was more of a civil exponent of white Protestant social values than a repressive hate group".

American writer Kelly J. Baker argues that religion was crucial, suggesting that the Klan was based on a particular brand of Protestantism that resonated with mainstream Americans: Klan members "embraced Protestant Christianity and a crusade to save America from domestic as well as foreign threats." The Klan consisted primarily of Baptists, Methodists, and the Disciples of Christ. The "more elite or liberal" Protestant denominations—Unitarians, Episcopalians, Congregationalists, and Lutherans—were less likely to join.

==== State-wide focus ====
Historians focused on states like Alabama and Indiana to analyze the Klan. In Indiana, traditional political historians focused on leaders like the Indiana Klan's Grand Dragon, D.C. Stephenson, whose conviction in the case of Madge Oberholtzer helped rout the Klan nationwide. Historian Kenneth T. Jackson noted the 1920s Klan as a part of cities and urbanization—"the Invisible Empire had a strong urban flavor from the beginning"—and local chapters often acted as fraternal organizations. Historian Leonard Moore suggested that the Klan was fearful of the changes in immigration and those whom they believed subverted an ideal, Protestant moral standard. He argued that it was an interest group for "average white Protestants" believing their "values should be dominant." Earlier on, the University of Notre Dame was established near South Bend, Indiana, as Northern Indiana's industrial cites attracted large Catholic populations of European immigrants. In May 1924, students there blocked the Klansmen when they scheduled a regional meeting in the city, causing counterattacks. Football coach Knute Rockne kept the students on campus to avoid further violence.

In Alabama, some activists joined the Klan to fight the old guard establishment; Hugo Black was a member who campaigned and won a seat in the U.S. Senate by focusing on anti-Catholicism. In rural Alabama, the Klan enforced Jim Crow laws, and its members resorted more to violence against black people for apparent infringements of the social order of white supremacy. Racial terrorism was weaponized in smaller towns to suppress black political activity. Elbert Williams of Brownsville, Tennessee, was lynched in 1940 for trying to organize black residents to register to vote, and Jesse Thorton of Luverne, Alabama, was lynched for not addressing a police officer as "Mister."

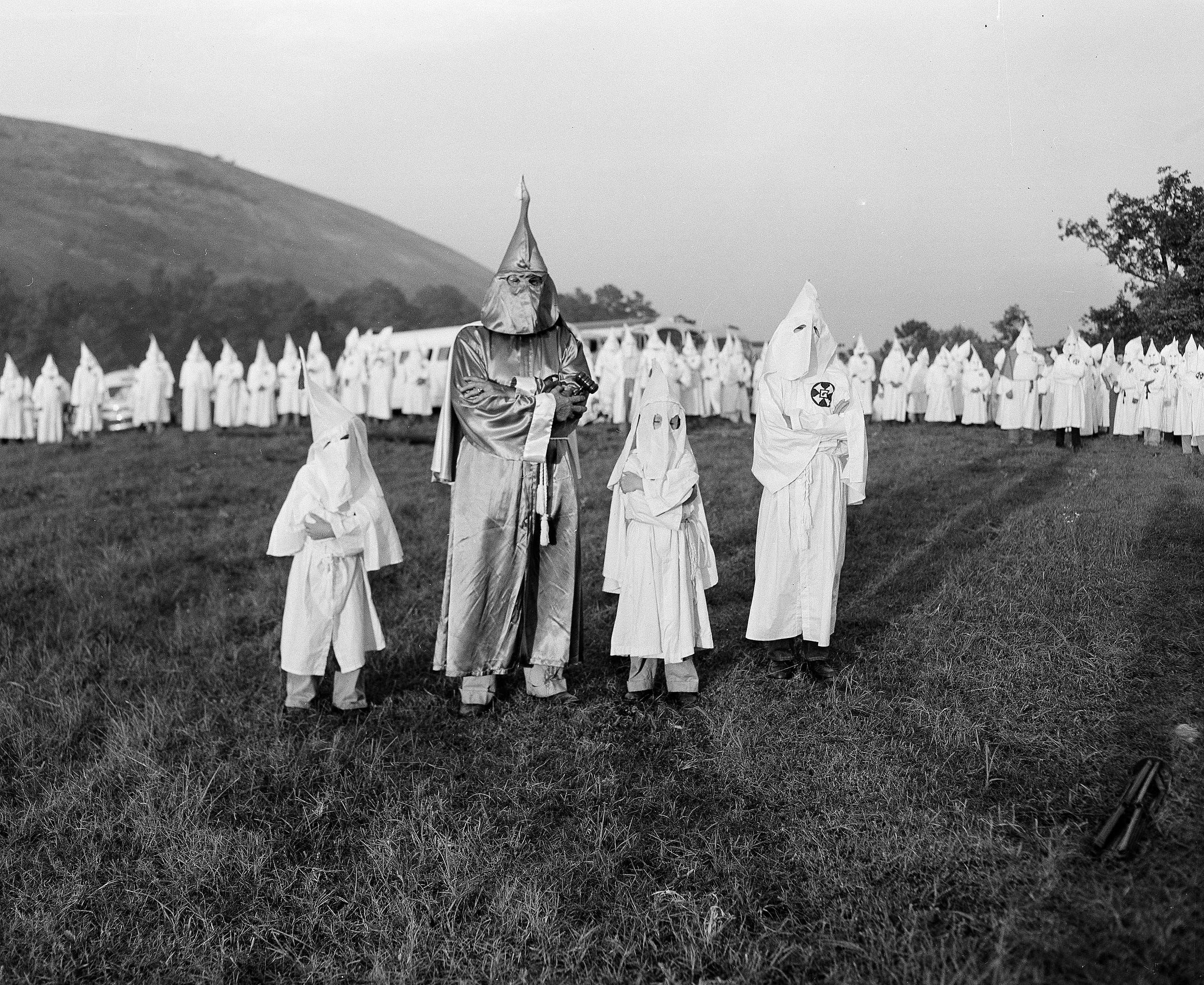
Two children wearing Ku Klux Klan robes and hoods stand on either side of Grand Dragon Samuel Green at Stone Mountain, Georgia, on July 24, 1948.

=== Later Ku Klux Klan organizations (1940s–present) ===
In 1944, the second Ku Klux Klan was disbanded by Imperial Wizard James A. Colescott after the Internal Revenue Service (IRS) levied a substantial tax liability against the organization. Two years later, in 1946, Samuel Green established a new Klan group at a ceremony on Stone Mountain, operating primarily within Georgia. Green was succeeded by Samuel Roper as Imperial Wizard in 1949, and Roper was followed by Eldon Edwards in 1950. Based in Atlanta, Edwards attempted to rebuild the organization by uniting disparate Klan factions across the United States. However, these efforts were short-lived, as internal rivalries and competition among regional groups led to renewed fragmentation.

In 1959, Roy Davis was elected to succeed Edwards as national leader. Edwards has previously appointed Davis Grand Dragon of Texas in an effort to consolidate their organizations, and Davis already led the Original Knights of the Ku Klux Klan in Texas, Arkansas, Louisiana, and Mississippi. During 1961 and 1962, Davis held rallies in Florida and other southern states to recruit new members. A longtime associate of William J. Simmons, Davis had been active in the Klan since its reorganization in 1915. The White Knights of the Ku Klux Klan formed later in 1964 after breaking away from the Original Knights. According to an FBI report published in May 1965, the Klan had splintered into fourteen separate organizations with a combined membership of approximately 9,000. The report had identified Roy Davis's Original Knights as the largest faction, with about 1,500 members, while Robert Shelton of Alabama led another faction numbering between 400 and 600 members.

Congressional investigators found that by the end of 1965, most members of the Original Knights had joined Shelton's United Klans, leading to the dissolution of the Original Knights. Shelton's organization continued to absorb members from competing groups and remained the largest Klan faction into the 1970s, reaching an estimated peak of 30,000 members and an additional 250,000 non‑member supporters during the late 1960s.

==== 1950s–1960s: Klan activity during the civil rights era ====
After the national organization's decline, smaller independent groups adopted the name "Ku Klux Klan", along with some variations. They had no formal relations with each other, and most had no connections to the second Klan, except for the terminology and costumes.

Beginning in the 1950s, individual Klan groups in Birmingham, Alabama resisted social change and the black individuals' efforts to improve their life and standing, leading to bombings of houses in transitional neighborhoods; the city was nicknamed "Bombingham" due to the concentration of bombings. Since white individuals worked in the mining and steel industries, there was access to these materials.

Alabama Klan groups closely allied with the police under the tenure of police commissioner Bull Connor and operated with impunity. Connor allowed Klan members to attack Freedom Riders in 1961 for up to fifteen and twenty minutes before sending in the police. Due to failures to protect the Freedom Riders, the federal government established intervention and protection. In Alabama and Mississippi, members of the Klan tried to forge alliances with governors' administrations. In Birmingham and other places, the Klan bombed the houses of civil rights activists, sometimes weaponizing physical violence, intimidation, and assassination directly. Due to this disfranchisement of black people, most could not serve on juries, which were all-white and could deliver biased verdicts and sentences.

A report by the Southern Regional Council, a racial equality organization in Atlanta, suggested that the homes of 40 black southern families were bombed during 1951 and 1952; victims were mostly social activists, but some were those who refused to accept or uphold racism or were innocent bystanders.

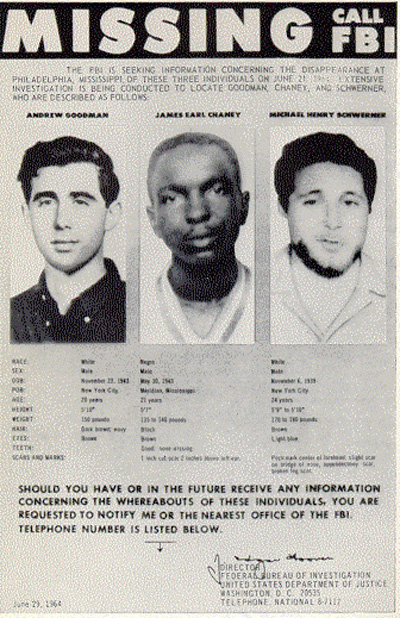
Goodman, Chaney, and Schwerner were three civil rights workers abducted and murdered by members of the Ku Klux Klan.

===== Notorious murders and bombings =====
During the 1950s and 1960s, Klan members carried out a series of highly publicized murders and bombings that drew national attention and condemnation. These incidents include the 1951 Christmas Eve bombing of NAACP activists Harry and Harriette Moore in Mims, Florida, the 1957 murder of Willie Edwards Jr. in Alabama, the 1963 assassination of NAACP organizer Medgar Evers in Mississippi, the 1963 16th Street Baptist Church bombing in Birmingham, and the 1964 murders of civil rights workers James Chaney, Andrew Goodman, and Michael Schwerner in Mississippi. Other cases from this period include the 1964 murders of two black teenagers, Henry Hezekiah Dee and Charles Eddie Moore, the 1965 killing of Viola Liuzzo in Alabama, the 1966 firebombing that led to the death of NAACP leader Vernon Dahmer, the murder of Clarence Triggs, and the 1967 bombings in Jackson, Mississippi, targeting Methodist activist Robert Kochtitzky, a synagogue, and residence of Rabbi Perry Nussbaum.

==== Resistance ====
Considerable Klan resistance occurred among African Americans and white allies to the Klan. In 1953, newspaper publishers in North Carolina in W. Horace Carter and Willard Cole shared the Pulitzer Prize for Public Service for their campaigns against the Klan "at the risk of economic loss and personal danger" with convictions of "over one hundred Klansmen" and an "end to terrorism in their communities". In a North Carolina incident, the Klan burned crosses at the homes of two Lumbee Native Americans for associating with white people in 1958. When the Klan held a nighttime rally nearby, hundreds of Lumbee surrounded them—gunfire was exchanged—causing the Klan to be routed at what became known as the Battle of Hayes Pond.

The Federal Bureau of Investigation (FBI) had paid Klan informants, especially in Birmingham in the early 1960s; however, the FBI's relations with local law enforcement agencies and the Klan were often ambiguous. J. Edgar Hoover, head of the FBI at the time, had more concerns about possible Communist links to civil right activists than about controlling the Klan. In 1964, the FBI's COINTELPRO program began attempts to infiltrate and disrupt civil rights groups.

The government revived the Reconstruction-era Enforcement Acts and Klan Act to extend federal enforcement of citizens' civil rights and as a basis of investigations and indictments when it came to notorious cases, including the 1964 murders of Chaney, Goodman, and Schwerner and the 1965 murder of Viola Liuzzo. In 1965, the House Un-American Activities Committee had started an investigation into the Klan, investigating its front organizations, finances, methods, and divisions.

==== 1970s–present: Klan activity ====
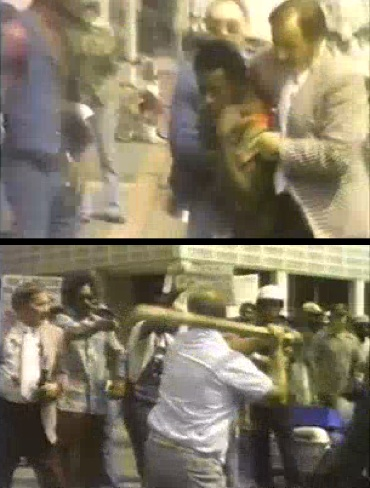
Violence at a Klan march in Mobile, Alabama, 1977

When federal legislation that prohibited segregation and enforcement of voting rights passed, Klan groups opposed the court-ordered busing to desegregate schools, affirmative action, and the more open immigration in the 1960s. In 1971, Klan members used bombs to destroy 10 school buses in Pontiac, Michigan. By 1975, there were known Klan groups on most college campuses in Louisiana; other universities with known Klan groups included Vanderbilt University, University of Georgia, University of Mississippi, University of Akron, and University of Southern California. The Klan was also involved in intimidating Vietnamese refugees in the Galveston Bay Area. The Klan utilized terroristic means in order to achieve their objectives.

==== Notorious cases ====
On November 3, 1979, the Klan and the National Socialist Party of America killed five communist protesters in Greensboro, North Carolina, now known as the Greensboro massacre. The Communist Workers' Party had sponsored a rally against the Klan in an effort to organize predominantly black industrial workers in the area. Klan members drove up with arms in their car trunks and attacked marchers.

In 1980, following a Klan initiation rally, three Klan members shot four elderly black women in Chattanooga, Tennessee: Viola Ellison, Lela Evans, Opal Jackson, and Katherine Johnson, and a fifth woman, Fannie Crumsey, was injured by flying glass in the incident. Attempted murder charges were filed against the three Klan members, two of whom—Bill Church and Larry Payne—were acquitted by an all-white jury. The third defendant, Marshall Thrash, was sentenced by the same jury to nine months on lesser charges. He was released after three months. In 1982, a jury awarded the five women $535,000 in a civil trial.

After Michael Donald was lynched in 1981 in Alabama, the FBI investigated his death, and the U.S. attorney prosecuted the case. Two Klan members were convicted for his murder, including Henry Francis Hays. After exhausting the appeals process, Hays was executed by electric chair for Donald's death in Alabama on June 6, 1997. It was the first time since 1913 that a white person had been executed in Alabama for a crime against a black person.

With the support of attorneys Morris Dees of the Southern Poverty Law Center (SPLC) and state senator Michael A. Figures, Donald's mother Beulah Mae Donald sued the Klan in civil court in Alabama. Her lawsuit against the United Klans of America was tried in February 1987. The all-white jury found the Klan responsible for the lynching of Donald, and ordered the Klan to pay $7 million. The Klan did not have sufficient funds and was forced to sell their national headquarters in Tuscaloosa.

==== Klan infiltrations ====
Jerry Thompson, a newspaper reporter who infiltrated the Klan in 1979, reported that the FBI's COINTELPRO efforts were highly successful. Rival Klan factions accused each other's leaders of being FBI informants. William Wilkinson of the Invisible Empire, Knights of the Ku Klux Klan, was revealed to have been working for the FBI. Thompson reported that Klan leaders showed great concern about a series of civil lawsuits filed by the Southern Poverty Law Center, which claimed damages amounting to millions of dollars. These lawsuits happened because Klan members shot into a group of African Americans. Klansmen curtailed their activities to conserve the money for their defense against the lawsuits.

A Jewish Defense League (JDL) member, known by the pseudonym "Annette", infiltrated neo-Nazi and Klan groups in 1979; he informed on two dozen Klansmen and neo-Nazis, providing this information to JDL's leader Edward Rainov. Edwin L. Reynolds, the Grand Dragon of the White Knights, a New Jersey Ku Klux Klan group, and John Duffy, a leader in the National Socialist Liberation Front and one another man were arrested "on charges of rape, aggravated assault and threatening to kill the woman". According to Annette, the men lured her to a hotel room, handcuffed her, and sexually assaulted her, which broke her wrists.

==== Neo-Nazi alliances and Stormfront ====
White Confederacy conference in 1977, from the left: New York Klansman, Robert Brannen (National Socialist Movement), John Ross Taylor (Western Guard Party), John Gerhardt (American White Nationalist Party), William Charles Sickles (Adamic Knights of the KKK), Joseph Chance (Minutemen of Indiana)

The Klan and neo-Nazi collaboration started at the latest in 1975 with the forming of the White Confederacy, an umbrella organization of a dozen Klan and neo-Nazi groups, including the Adamic Knights of the KKK and the New York Klan. By the late 1970s the neo-Nazis and Klan were already established allies, the New Jersey Klan working with the National Socialist Liberation Front and the National Socialist Party of America and the Klan perpetrating the Greensboro massacre.

In 1995, Don Black and Chloë Hardin, the ex-wife of Ku Klux Klan grand wizard David Duke, launched a small bulletin board system (BBS) called Stormfront, which later developed into a prominent online forum associated with white nationalism, Neo-Nazism, hate speech, racism, and antisemitism in the early 21st century. Scholars and monitoring organizations have cited Stormfront as an example of how extremist groups have used the Internet to recruit supporters, build transnational networks, and facilitate research, growing into "what may be the Western world’s most popular forum for so called 'white nationalists' to post articles" and "engage in discussions". Kevin C. Thompson has noted that the "stigmatised and disenfranchised societal groups", such as the Ku Klux Klan, "are using cyberspace technology as a means of organising themselves in the face of mainstream social rejection and restrictions", providing a "substantial benefit" to these groups.

In a 2007 report, the Anti-Defamation League (ADL) stated that many Ku Klux Klan groups had formed strong alliances with other white supremacist organizations, including neo-Nazi groups. According to the ADL and other observers, some Klan organizations have become increasingly "nazified", adopting the symbols, styles, and, in some cases, organizational practices associated with white power skinhead and neo-Nazi movements, a development that has broadened their potential alliances but also blurred distinctions between historically separate extremist traditions.

==== Current developments ====
The modern Ku Klux Klan is no longer a unified national organization; instead, it consists of numerous small, independent chapters operating across the United States. A 1999 ADL report estimated that the Klan then comprised "no more than a few thousand members organized into slightly more than 100 units". Nearly two decades later, the Southern Poverty Law Center (SPLC) reported in 2017 that "at least 29 separate, rival Klan groups" were active nationwide, while noting that they frequently compete for members, dues, media attention, and claims to historical legitimacy. The decentralized structure of these chapters has made them more difficult for researchers and law-enforcement agencies to monitor, and estimates of total membership vary. Analysts believe that roughly two-thirds of Klan members reside in the Southern United States, with most of the remainder concentrated in the lower Midwest.

Although the Klan's overall membership has declined for several decades, scholars attribute this trend to a combination of factors, including the organization's limited ability to adapt to online communication, its long history of violence, competition from other extremist groups, and a broader decline in the number of young activists willing to join formal hate‑based organizations. At the same time, membership patterns have not been uniform. In 2015, the number of Klan chapters nationwide increased from 72 to 190, a development the SPLC linked to broader growth among several extremist movements, including both Klan and black separatist groups. A 2016 SPLC analysis found that hate groups in general were increasing in number in the United States, while the ADL concluded that the "organized Klan groups", despite periodic spikes in activity, "continued a long-term trend of decline" and remained "mostly small, disjointed groups that continually change in name and leadership".

Klan messaging has adapted to contemporary social and political concerns, even as the organization's overall influence has waned. New Klan recruitment efforts have often attempted to capitalize on public anxieties surrounding issues such as illegal immigration, urban crime, and same-sex marriage. In 2006, J. Keith Akins argued that "Klan literature and propaganda is rabidly homophobic and encourages violence against gays and lesbians," noting that since the late 1970s the Klan had increasingly targeted LGBTQ+ communities. Following the September 11, 2001 attacks, Klan groups also produced Islamophobic propaganda and distributed anti-Islamic flyers.

The American Civil Liberties Union (ACLU) has provided legal support to various Klan factions in cases involving First Amendment protections, including the right to hold public rallies, parades, and marches, as well as the right to field political candidates.

In February 2019 in Linden, Alabama, the local weekly newspaper The Democrat-Reporter featured an editorial written by Goodloe Sutton titled the "Klan needs to ride again." It urged the Klan "to return to staging their night rides" due to tax proposals to raise taxes in Alabama. In an interview, Sutton suggested that Washington D.C. could be "clean[ed] out" by way of lynchings to "hang all of them", also referring to hanging "socialist-communists" and even compared the Klan to the NAACP. The editorial and his subsequent comments provoked resignation calls from Alabama politicians and the Alabama Press Association. The University of Southern Mississippi's School of Communication, where he was an alumnus, removed him from its Mass Communication and Journalism Hall of Fame and "strongly condemn[ed]" his remarks. Sutton was stripped of a distinguished community journalist award he was presented in 2009 by Auburn University's Journalism Advisory Council. Sutton expressed no regrets; he said that the editorial was intended to be "ironic" and "not many people understand irony today."

==== Current Klan organizations ====
The Anti-Defamation League (ADL) maintains a current list of Klan organizations. According to a 2011 list, there are eight large Klan groups in existence today: the Bayou Knights of the Ku Klux Klan, the Church of the American Knights of the Ku Klux Klan, the Imperial Klans of America, the Knights of the White Camelia, the Keystone Knights of the Ku Klux Klan, affiliated with the Aryan Freedom Network, the Knights of the Ku Klux Klan, headed by Thomas Robb, which claims to be the largest organization in America today, the Loyal White Knights of the Ku Klux Klan, thought to be the largest Klan chapter, and the White Knights of the Ku Klux Klan.

== Outside North America ==
Regarded by many historians as one of the earliest terrorist organizations in the United States, the Ku Klux Klan has inspired various attempts to organize affiliated or imitative groups outside North America, including in parts of Asia, Europe, and Oceania. These efforts have generally produced only small, short-lived, or marginal organizations with limited local impact.

=== Africa, Americas, and Asia ===
In apartheid-era South Africa in the 1960s, some far-right activists adopted Klan-style imagery, such as writing "Ku Klux Klan Africa" on the African National Congress (ANC) offices in Cape Town and wearing Klan-like costumes. In response, American Klan leader Terry Venable attempted to establish a branch at Rhodes University. In the 1970s, a Ku Klux Klan group in Rhodesia, led by Len Idensohn, criticized Prime Minister Ian Smith for what it viewed as political moderation.

In Mexico in 1924, a group of vigilantes claimed to have organized themselves into a Klan directed against "criminals," and published a program of "social epuration". In São Paulo, Brazil, the website of a group called itself the Imperial Klans of Brazil was shut down in 2003, and the group's leader was arrested. A Klan presence has also been reported in the Panama Canal Zone. In Cuba, an organization known as the Ku Klux Klan Kubano targeted West Indian migrant workers and Afro-Cubans, drawing on fears associated with the 1912 Negro Rebellion. During the Vietnam War, klaverns were established on some U.S. military bases, where they were at times tolerated by military authorities. In the 1920s, a small Klan presence also briefly existed in Shanghai.

=== Europe ===
Recruitment activity has periodically been reported in the United Kingdom. In the 1960s, klaverns were established in the Midlands; the following decade saw visits by leading Klansmen, and in the 1990s there were recruitment efforts in London, Scotland, and the Midlands. The British scene was marked by internal turmoil and splintering; for example, one leader, Allan Beshella, resigned after a 1972 conviction for child sexual abuse became public. Gerry Gable estimated there were 200 Klansmen in the United Kingdom.

In 2018 the members of the banned neo-Nazi group National Action talked of forming a "KKK-themed death squad", and their successor organization was named "TripleK Mafia" and members were pictured in Klan robes. Members included service members in the British Army. Members Adam Thomas, 22, Claudia Patatas, 38 and Daniel Bogunovic, 27 were convicted after a seven-week trial at the Crown Court in Birmingham of membership in a terrorist organization. The same year there was a march in front of a mosque in Northern Ireland and the participants wore Klan robes. The Klan allegedly includes members of the loyalist paramilitaries.

In Germany, a KKK-related group called Ritter des Feurigen Kreuzes ("Knights of the Fiery Cross") was founded in 1925 in Berlin by naturalized German-born U.S. citizens. It attracted around 300 members, largely from middle-class occupations such as merchants and clerks, but soon suffered internal conflicts and public ridicule in the press. After the Nazi Party came to power, the group disbanded and many members joined Nazi organizations. In the spring of 1970 in Frankfurt, U.S. Army specialist Edward Kaneta was beaten by four white sergeants for fraternizing with a black soldier; the assailants were reported to be members of an on-base klavern with 47 members.

In 1991, Dennis Mahon of Oklahoma's White Knights of the Ku Klux Klan reportedly assisted in organizing Klan groups in Germany. Another German KKK‑related group, the European White Knights of the Ku Klux Klan, gained notoriety in 2012 when media reports revealed that two police officers who were members of the organization would be allowed to keep their jobs. In 2019, German authorities conducted raids against a group called the National Socialist Knights of the Ku Klux Klan Deutschland, which was suspected of posing a security risk.

In 2001, David Duke traveled to Moscow to network with Russian nationalist activists who espoused antisemitic views. During this visit, he described Russia as "the key to white survival" and attributed many events in 20th-century Russian history to Jews. In the 1920s, rumors circulated that Klan organizations existed in Lithuania and Czechoslovakia, although these reports appear to have reflected small or short-lived efforts rather than large-scale movements: "for there is no indication that any such chapters operated actively or endured".

The Navi Clan ("Holy Church of the White Race") was founded in Russia in 1996 and adopted Klan-style robes and rituals modeled on those of the Ku Klux Klan. The group staged an event in which about 50 members, dressed in robes and carrying torches, participated in a ritual led by Ilya Lazarenko. In 2006, a group calling itself the Russian Ku Klux Klan staged a mock execution of an alleged Tajik drug dealer; the perpetrators, dressed in robes, hanged the victim with a rope. Although the victim survived, a court found that the act had caused "psychological harm," and the participants were each sentenced to three years of probation.

In September 2015, several dozen people rioted in Hennala, Finland, throwing rocks and fireworks at refugees and Red Cross staff working at a refugee center. The incident attracted national attention because some participants used Ku Klux Klan imagery. Then-Finance Minister Alexander Stubb condemned the riot, describing the sight of people in Klan robes carrying a Finnish flag as a "travesty".

=== Oceania ===
In Australia in the late 1990s, former One Nation party member Peter Coleman established Klan branches in several parts of the country, and around 2012 the Klan reportedly attempted to infiltrate other political parties, such as Australia First. Branches have existed in New South Wales and Victoria, and have also been alleged in Queensland. Unlike many U.S. Klan groups, Australian branches did not require members to be Christian but did require them to be white.

On 16 February 1872, white settlers in the Kingdom of Fiji formed a chapter of the Ku Klux Klan as part of broader settler resistance to the Fijian government. Members swore an oath to carry arms and refuse to pay taxes, and their headquarters—a former hotel in Levuka—was fortified with artillery pieces. At a general meeting on 24 February, the chapter adopted resolutions asserting that "the existing mode of government was contrary to the welfare of the community". The group's activities contributed to instability in Levuka; in one instance, about 70 Klan members freed a white settler charged with murdering a Fijian from prison. In March 1872, the chapter was renamed the "British Subjects' Mutual Protection Society" (BSMPS), which advocated for British annexation of Fiji. Fiji became a British colony in 1874, and governor Sir Hercules Robinson fully suppressed the BSMPS by 1875.

In the 1920s, rumors also suggested that Klan organizations existed in New Zealand, though available evidence indicates that any such groups were small and short-lived.

== Titles, vocabulary, and symbols ==
=== Titles and vocabulary ===
Membership in the Ku Klux Klan is secret; like many fraternal organizations, the Klan employs signs and coded language that members can use to recognize one another. In conversation, a member may use the acronym AYAK ("Are you a Klansman?") to identify themselves covertly to another potential member, to which the response AKIA ("A Klansman, I am.") completes the greeting. Another possible greeting is 311, as K is the eleventh letter of the alphabet and 3 times 11 is KKK. Members also use 33/6, since 11 times 3 is 33 and they believe that "the Klan is currently in its sixth historical 'era.'" FGRN is a Klan acronym for "For God, Race and Nation," and ITSUB is used for "In The Sacred Unfailing Being," referring to God.

More acronyms include KABARK that means "Konstantly Applied By All Regular Klansmen", and KIGY is used by members that translates to "Klansman I Greet You." LOTIE means "Lady Of The Invisible Empire" which is a female Klan member. KLASP refers to "Klannish Loyalty, A Sacred Principle." The phrase "Non Silba Sed Anthar" means "Not Self, But Others", used in many forms and rituals. A lot of these coded words can be used in coded messages for the purposes of text messages and social media.

Another core part of Klan code involves the use of hand signals and signs. The most common one that has survived is the "Klan salute", which "resembles a Nazi salute" used with the "left arm" instead of the right. Moreover, Klan members will "separate the fingers of their hand when making the salute" in an effort to "represent the 4 K's of Knights of the Ku Klux Klan". Later on, however, Klans members frequently used hand signs, much like street gangs do, where its members flash their "index and middle fingers held out sideways," which "look[s] more or less like the letter 'K.'"

Throughout its history, the Klan has coined numerous terms beginning with the prefix "KI," including:

- Klabee – treasurer
- Klavern – local organization
- Imperial Kleagle – recruiter
- Klecktoken – initiation fee
- Kligrapp – secretary
- Klonvokation – gathering
- Kloran – ritual book
- Kloreroe – delegate
- Imperial Kludd – chaplain

All of the above terminology was created by William Joseph Simmons as part of his 1915 revival of the Klan. The Reconstruction-era Klan used a different set of titles; the only titles that carried over were "Wizard" for the overall leader of the Klan and "Night Hawk" for the official response for security.

The Imperial Kludd served as chaplain of the Imperial Klonvokation and performed "such other duties as may be required by the Imperial Wizard." The Imperial Kaliff was the second-highest officer, ranking immediately below the Imperial Wizard.

=== Symbols ===
The Ku Klux Klan has used a variety of symbols over the course of its history.

==== Blood Drop Cross ====
The most recognizable symbol used by the Klan for the past century has been the Mystic Insignia of a Klansman, commonly known as the Blood Drop Cross: a white cross on a red disk with what appears to be a blood drop in the center. It was first used in the early 1900s; the central symbol originally resembled a red and white taijitu but, over time, the white lobe disappeared and the design was reinterpreted as a "blood drop".

==== Triangular Klan symbol ====
The triangular Ku Klux Klan symbol consists of what appears to be a triangle within a triangle, visually similar to a Sierpiński triangle, but in fact represents three letter Ks facing inward. A variation of this symbol has the Ks facing outward instead of inward. The triangular KKK symbol is an older Klan emblem that has also been revived as a modern hate symbol.

==== Burning cross ====
Although the practice predates the Klan, in modern times the burning cross has become closely associated with the Ku Klux Klan and is widely regarded as one of the most potent hate symbols in the United States. Burning crosses did not become linked to the Klan until Thomas Dixon's The Clansman and its film adaptation, D. W. Griffith's The Birth of a Nation, inspired members of the second Klan to adopt the practice. In the contemporary period, the burning cross is so strongly associated with racial intimidation that it is used by many non-Klan racist groups and has spread to locations outside the United States.

Blood Drop Cross

Triangular Klan symbol

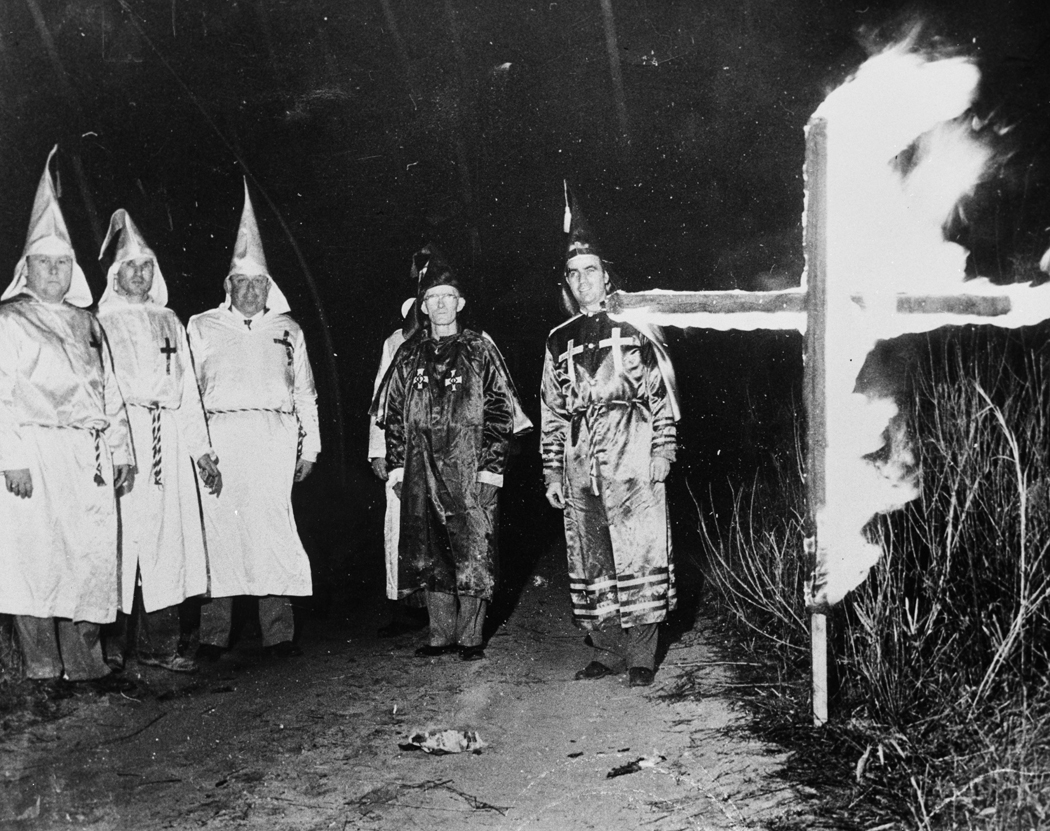
Cross burning in Lumberton, North Carolina (1958)

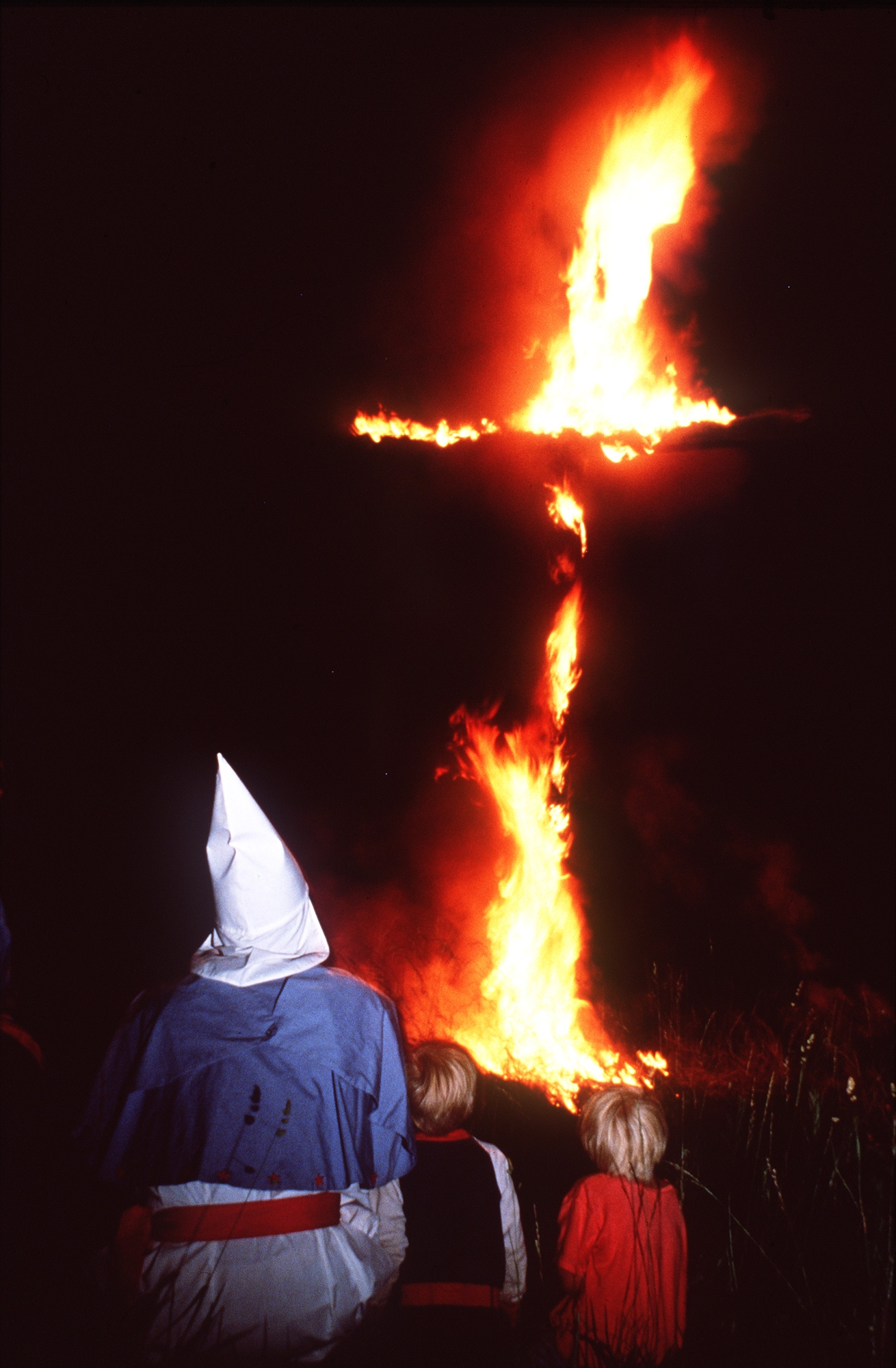
Cross burning in Oak Hill, Ohio (1987)

== See also ==
- Black Legion (political movement) – American white supremacist terrorist organization
- Camp Nordland – Resort in Andover, New Jersey
- History of the Ku Klux Klan in New Jersey
- Ku Klux Klan in Maine
- Ku Klux Klan members in United States politics
- Ku Klux Klan raid (Inglewood)
- Ku Klux Klan titles and vocabulary
- Leaders of the Ku Klux Klan – List of Ku Klux Klan leaders and their titles
- List of Ku Klux Klan organizations
- Mass racial violence in the United States
- Ocoee massacre – 1920 mass violence in Florida, U.S.
- Rosewood massacre – 1923 massacre of African Americans in Florida, US
- Terrorism in the United States
- White supremacy in the United States
