= Kelly J. Baker =

American writer (born 1980)

- Born: August 1980 (age 46); Marianna, Florida, US
- Education: Chipola College (AA); Florida State University (BA, MA, PhD)
- Occupation: Writer

Kelly J. Baker (born 1980) is an American writer and historian of religion. Her first book, Gospel According to the Klan (2011), examines the religious appeals of the 1920s Ku Klux Klan and she has since written on higher education, gender and labor, and popular culture, including in the memoir Grace Period (2017) and the essay collection Sexism Ed (2018). She is editor of the newsletter Women in Higher Education.

== Early life and education ==
Baker was born in August 1980 in Marianna, Florida. She earned an Associate of Arts from Chipola College. Baker completed a Bachelor of Arts in American Studies at Florida State University (FSU). She earned a Master of Arts in American Religious History from FSU. Her 2003 master's thesis was titled Henry Ossawa Tanner: Race, Religion, and Visual Mysticism. Her advisor was John Corrigan. She completed her Doctorate of Philosophy in American religious history at FSU in 2008.

== Career ==
As a graduate student, Baker began writing for a public audience as a contributing editor at the nascent Religion in American History blog. From 2007 to 2009, she was a lecturer at University of New Mexico and Central New Mexico Community College where she taught religious studies and humanities. From 2010 to 2013, Baker was a lecturer of religious studies and an affiliated faculty member of American and global studies at University of Tennessee. She began her career as a freelance writer in 2013, and in 2016, she started as the editor of Women in Higher Education.

Baker is a commentator on higher education, sexism, and religion and its intersections to race, class, gender, and violence. She co-hosts the podcast Pod Only Knows, which "invite[s] other people from the wide and wild world of religious studies to talk to them about why and how they do what they do and why their work matters to us all."

== Books ==
Gospel According to the Klan: The KKK's Appeal to Protestant America, 1915–1930 was published by the University Press of Kansas in 2011. Drawing on the Klan's official newspapers and magazines, it argues that the revived Klan of the 1920s justified its hatred through a form of Protestantism that resonated with mainstream Americans combining religion with nationalism, gender and race. It also examines the Klan's 1924 anti-Catholic riot at the University of Notre Dame. The book was named a Choice Outstanding Academic Title.

Her 2013 book The Zombies Are Coming!: The Realities of the Zombie Apocalypse in American Culture was published by Bondfire Books with a revised and expanded edition issued by Blue Crow Books in 2020. Grace Period: A Memoir in Pieces (2017) was published by killing the buddha and Raven Books, and Sexism Ed: Essays on Gender and Labor in Academia (2018) by Raven Books. With Joseph Fruscione she co-edited Succeeding Outside the Academy: Career Paths Beyond the Humanities, Social Sciences, and STEM (University Press of Kansas, 2018). Her 2020 essay collection Final Girl: And Other Essays on Grief, Trauma, and Mental Illness was published by Blue Crow Books.

== Personal life ==
Baker resides in Marianna, Florida, with her husband and five cats.

== Selected works ==
=== Books ===
- Baker, Kelly J. (2017). Gospel According to the Klan: The KKK's Appeal to Protestant America, 1915-1930. University Press of Kansas. ISBN 9780700624478.
- Baker, Kelly J. (2017). Grace Period: A Memoir in Pieces. Blue Crow Publishing, LLC. ISBN 9781947834040.
- Baker, Kelly J. (2018). Sexism Ed: Essays on Gender and Labor in Academia. Raven Books. ISBN 9781947834224.
- Fruscione, Joseph; Baker, Kelly J. (2018). Succeeding Outside the Academy: Career Paths Beyond the Humanities, Social Sciences, and STEM. University Press of Kansas. ISBN 9780700626885.
- Baker, Kelly J. (2020). The Zombies Are Coming: The Realities of the Zombie Apocalypse in American Culture (Revised and Expanded ed.). Blue Crow Books. ISBN 978-1947834491.
- Baker, Kelly J. (2020). Final Girl: And Other Essays on Grief, Trauma, and Mental Illness. Blue Crow Books. ISBN 9781947834514.
