= Spotted oak =

Spotted oak is a common name for several species of oaks and may refer to:

- Quercus buckleyi
- Quercus nigra, native to the eastern and south-central United States
- Quercus shumardii
- Quercus velutina, native to eastern and central North America
