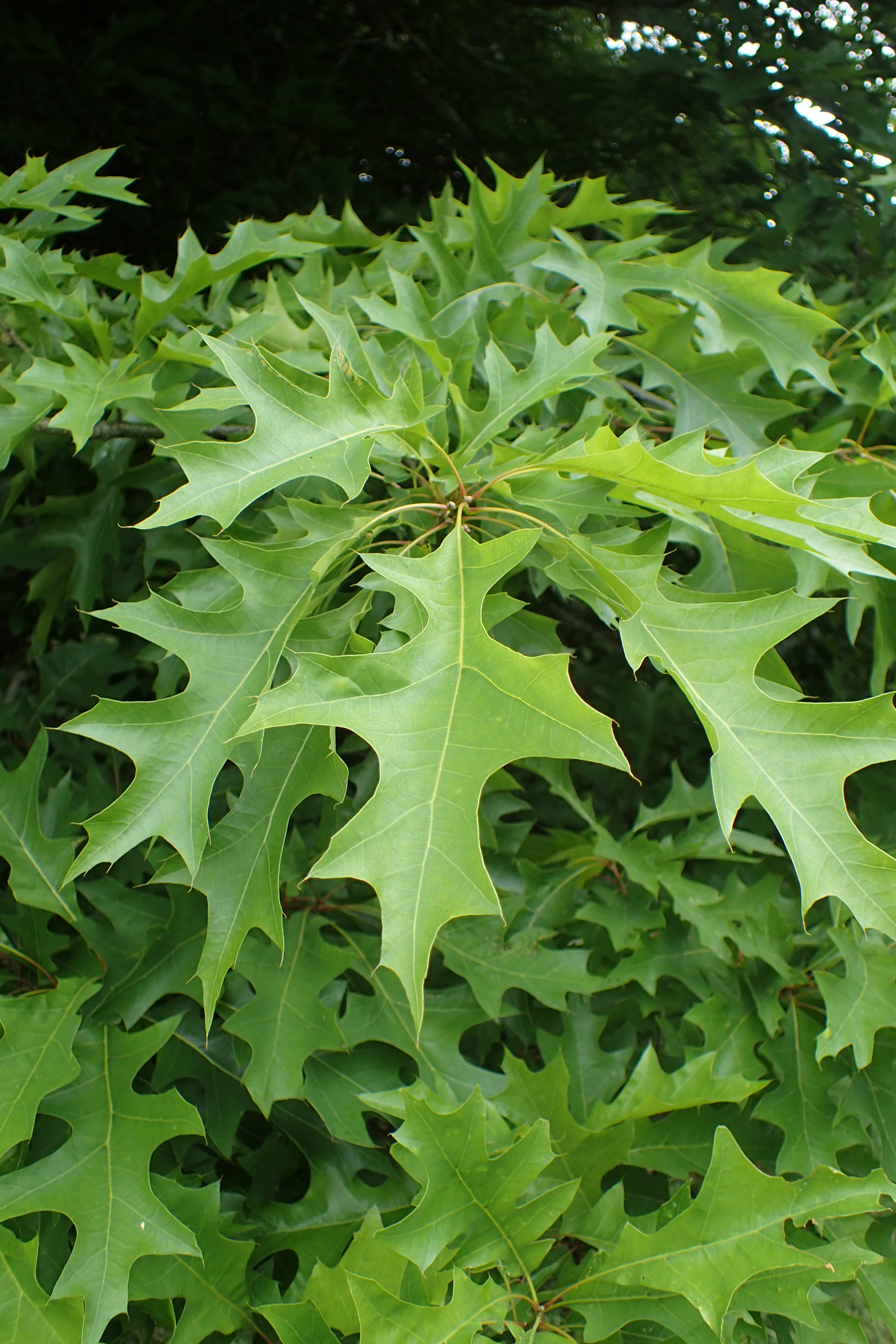

Conservation status
- Least Concern (IUCN 3.1)

Scientific classification
- Kingdom: Plantae
- Clade: Embryophytes
- Clade: Tracheophytes
- Clade: Spermatophytes
- Clade: Angiosperms
- Clade: Eudicots
- Clade: Rosids
- Order: Fagales
- Family: Fagaceae
- Genus: Quercus
- Subgenus: Quercus subg. Quercus
- Section: Quercus sect. Lobatae
- Species: Q. texana

Binomial name
- Quercus texana Buckley
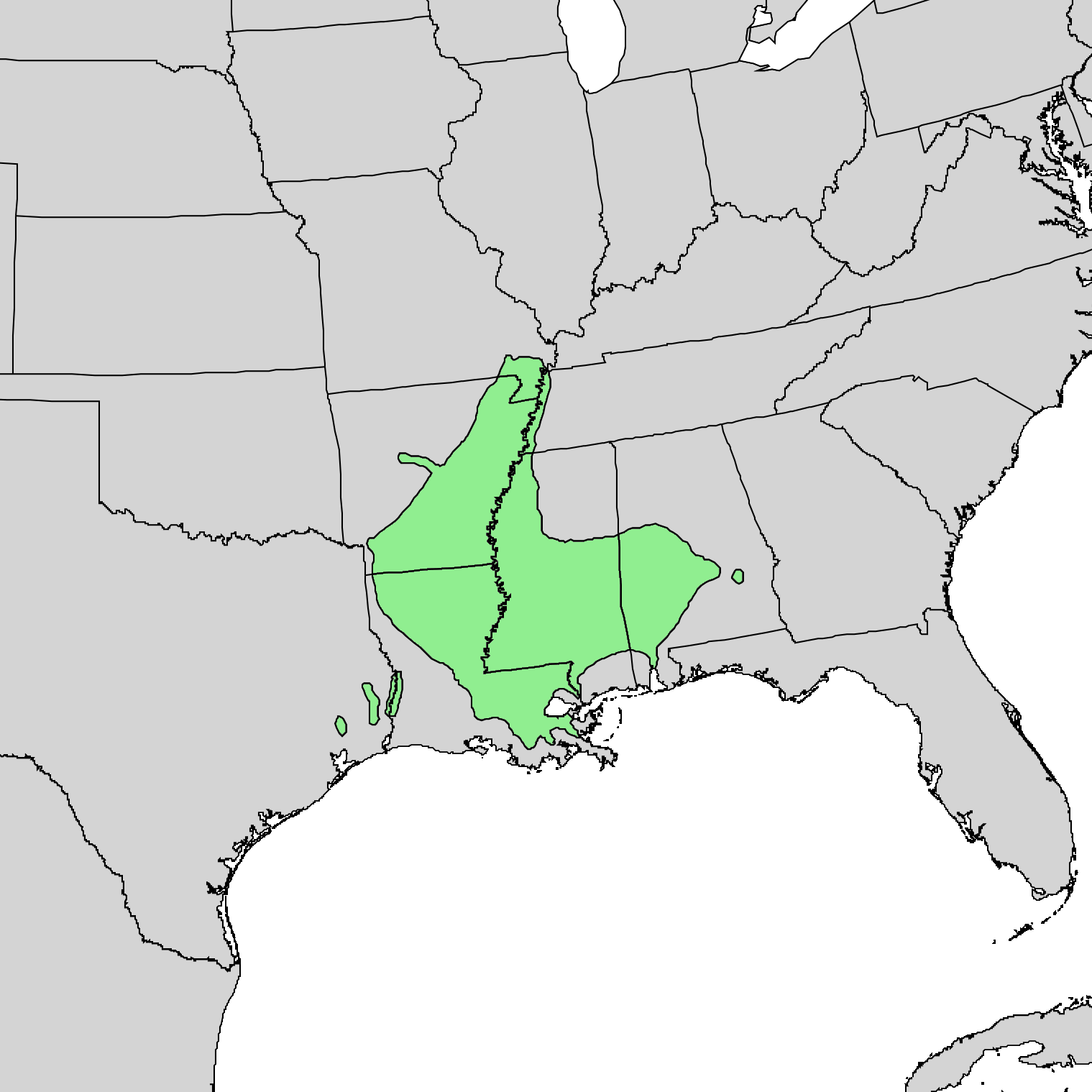
- Natural range of Quercus texana

Synonyms
- List: Quercus nuttallii E.J.Palmer; Quercus nuttallii var. cachensis E.J.Palmer; Quercus palustris f. nuttallii (E.J.Palmer) C.H.Mull.; Quercus rubra var. texana (Buckley) Buckley; Quercus shumardii subsp. texana (Buckley) A.E.Murray; Quercus shumardii var. texana (Buckley) Ashe

= Quercus texana =

Species of oak tree

Quercus texana, commonly known as Nuttall's oak, is a fast-growing, large deciduous oak tree.

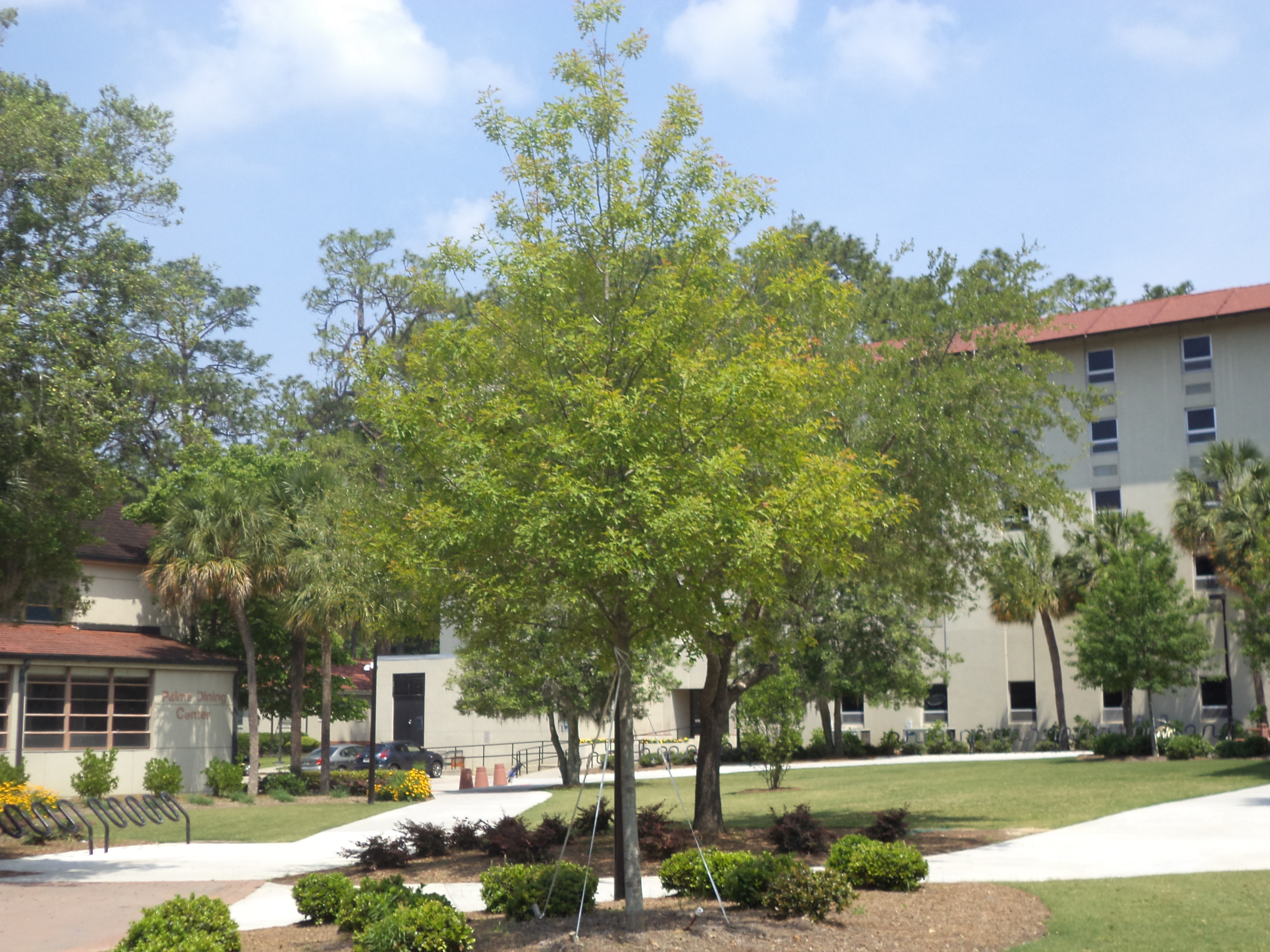
In cultivation

It is a tree growing up to 85 feet (25 meters) tall, with dark brown bark. It has leaves with sharp pointed lobes somewhat similar to those of the Georgia oak (Q. georgiana) and pin oak (Q. palustris). It is fast-growing and usually has a pleasing red color in autumn, much more reliably so than the pin oak.

This species was for years erroneously called Quercus nuttallii, but it is now known as Q. texana; this has created much confusion with Texas red oak, which was known as Q. texana but is now known as Q. buckleyi.

It is native to the south-central United States primarily in the lower Mississippi River Valley in Louisiana, Arkansas, Mississippi, Alabama, and western Tennessee. There are additional populations in eastern Texas, southeastern Oklahoma, southeastern Missouri, far western Kentucky, and the southernmost tip of Illinois.

It is still relatively obscure in the horticultural industry but is slowly gaining popularity due to its fast growth rate, ease of transplanting, good fall colors and ability to grow in wet soils. It is known for its ability to rapidly recover its gas exchange after flooding.

The current world record Nuttall's Oak tree is located at the White River National Wildlife Refuge, Desha County, Arkansas. According to the National Forests Champion Trees Official Register, it boasts a trunk circumference of 274 inches, a height of 100 feet, and a crown spread of 102 feet.
