= Stone Mountain =

Mountain and park in Georgia, United States

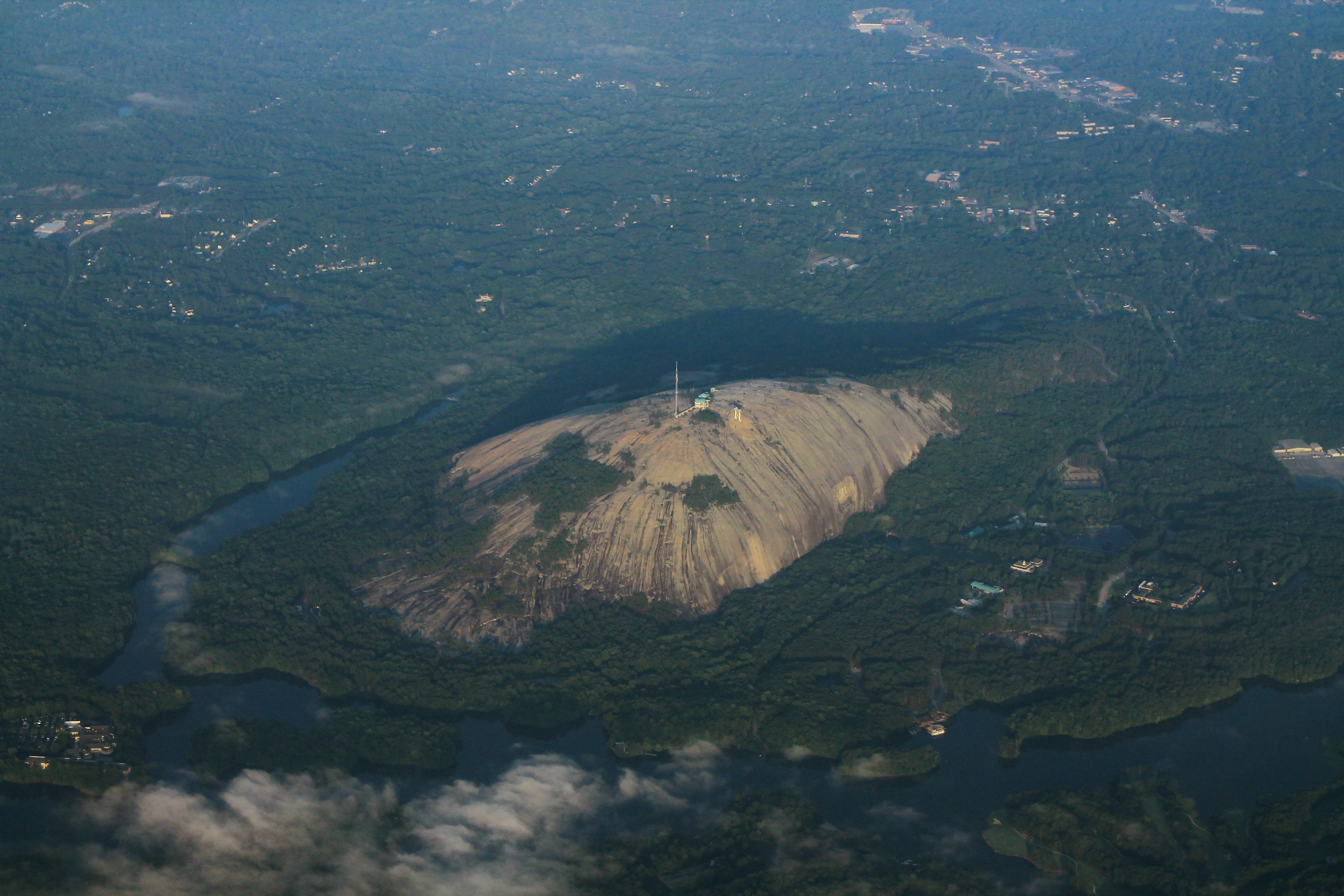
- Aerial view of Stone Mountain

Highest point
- Elevation: 1,686 ft (514 m)
- Prominence: 825 ft (251 m)
- Listing: Mountains of Georgia
- Coordinates: 33°48′21.40″N 84°8′43.52″W

Geography
- Location within Georgia
- Location: Stone Mountain, Georgia, United States
- Topo map(s): USGS Stone Mountain, Georgia

Stone Mountain is a quartz monzonite dome monadnock and the site of Stone Mountain Park, 15 miles (24 km) east of Atlanta, Georgia. Outside the park is the city of Stone Mountain, Georgia. The park is the most visited tourist site in the state of Georgia.

Stone Mountain, once owned by the Venable Brothers, was purchased by the state of Georgia in 1958 "as a memorial to the Confederacy". Stone Mountain Park officially opened on April 14, 1965 – 100 years to the day Abraham Lincoln's assassination took place, although recreational use of the park had been ongoing for several years prior. The park today is owned by the state of Georgia.

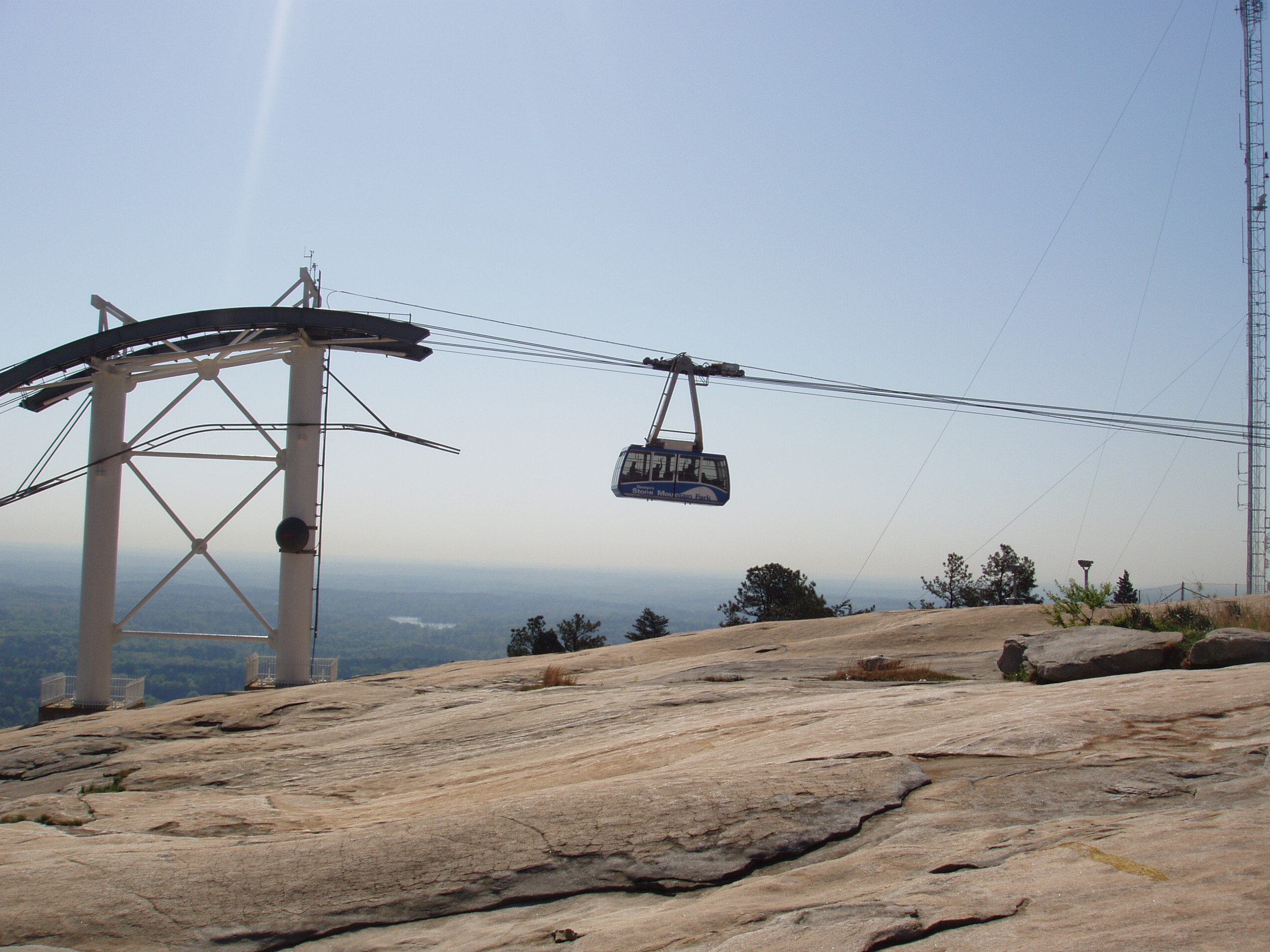
The mountain top and Skyride

Drone footage of Stone Mountain, 2022

The mountain, which ranges in composition from quartz monzonite to granite and granodiorite, is more than 5 miles (8.0 km) in circumference at its base. The summit of the mountain can be reached by a walk-up trail on the west side of the mountain or by the Skyride aerial tram.

At its summit, the elevation is 1,686 feet (514 m) above sea level and 825 feet (251 m) above the surrounding area. Stone Mountain is well known for not only its geology, but also the enormous rock relief on its north face, the largest high-relief artwork in the world. The carving, completed in 1972, depicts three Confederate leaders, Jefferson Davis, Robert E. Lee, and Stonewall Jackson.

== Geology ==
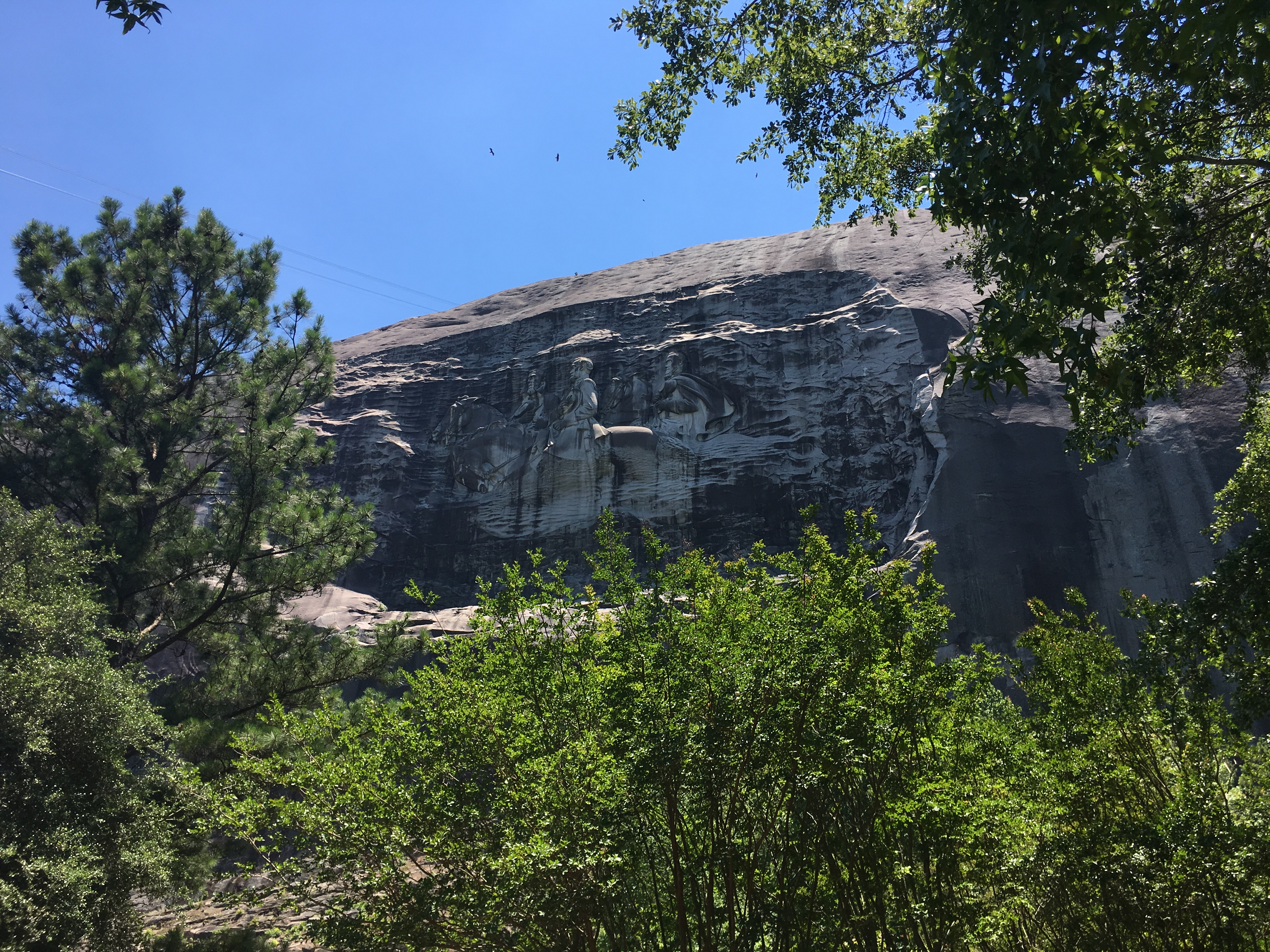
Stone Mountain through trees

Stone Mountain is a pluton, a type of igneous intrusion. Primarily composed of quartz monzonite, the dome of Stone Mountain was formed during the formation of the Blue Ridge Mountains around 300–350 million years ago (during the Carboniferous period), part of the Appalachian Mountains. It formed as a result of the upwelling of magma from within the Earth's crust. This magma solidified to form granite within the crust 5 to 10 miles (8.0 to 16.1 km) below the surface.

The Stone Mountain pluton continues underground 9 miles (14 km) at its longest point into Gwinnett County. Numerous reference books and Georgia literature have dubbed Stone Mountain as "the largest exposed piece of granite in the world". This misconception is most likely a result of misrepresentation by granite companies and early park administration. Stone Mountain, though often called a pink granite dome, actually ranges in composition from quartz monzonite to granite and granodiorite.

The minerals within the rock include quartz, plagioclase feldspar, microcline, and muscovite, with smaller amounts of biotite and tourmaline. The tourmaline is mostly black in color, and the majority of it exists as optically continuous skeletal crystals, but much larger, euhedral pegmatitic tourmaline crystals can also be found in the mountain's numerous, cross-cutting felsic dikes. Embedded in the granite are xenoliths or pieces of foreign rocks entrained in the magma.

The granite intruded into the metamorphic rocks of the Piedmont region during the last stages of the Alleghenian Orogeny, which was the time when North America and North Africa collided. Over time, erosion eventually exposed the present mountain of more resistant igneous rock. This intrusion of granite also gave rise to Panola Mountain and Arabia Mountain, both in DeKalb County, smaller outcroppings farther south of Stone Mountain.

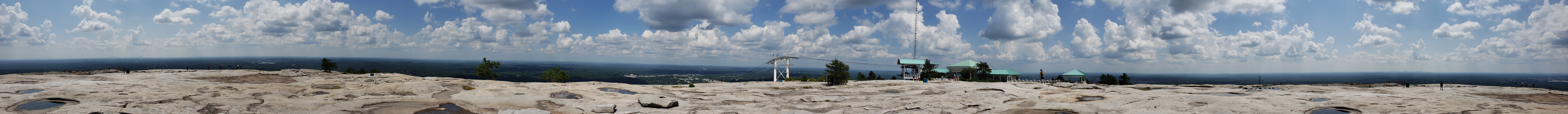
High resolution panoramic view from the summit of Stone Mountain

== Natural history ==
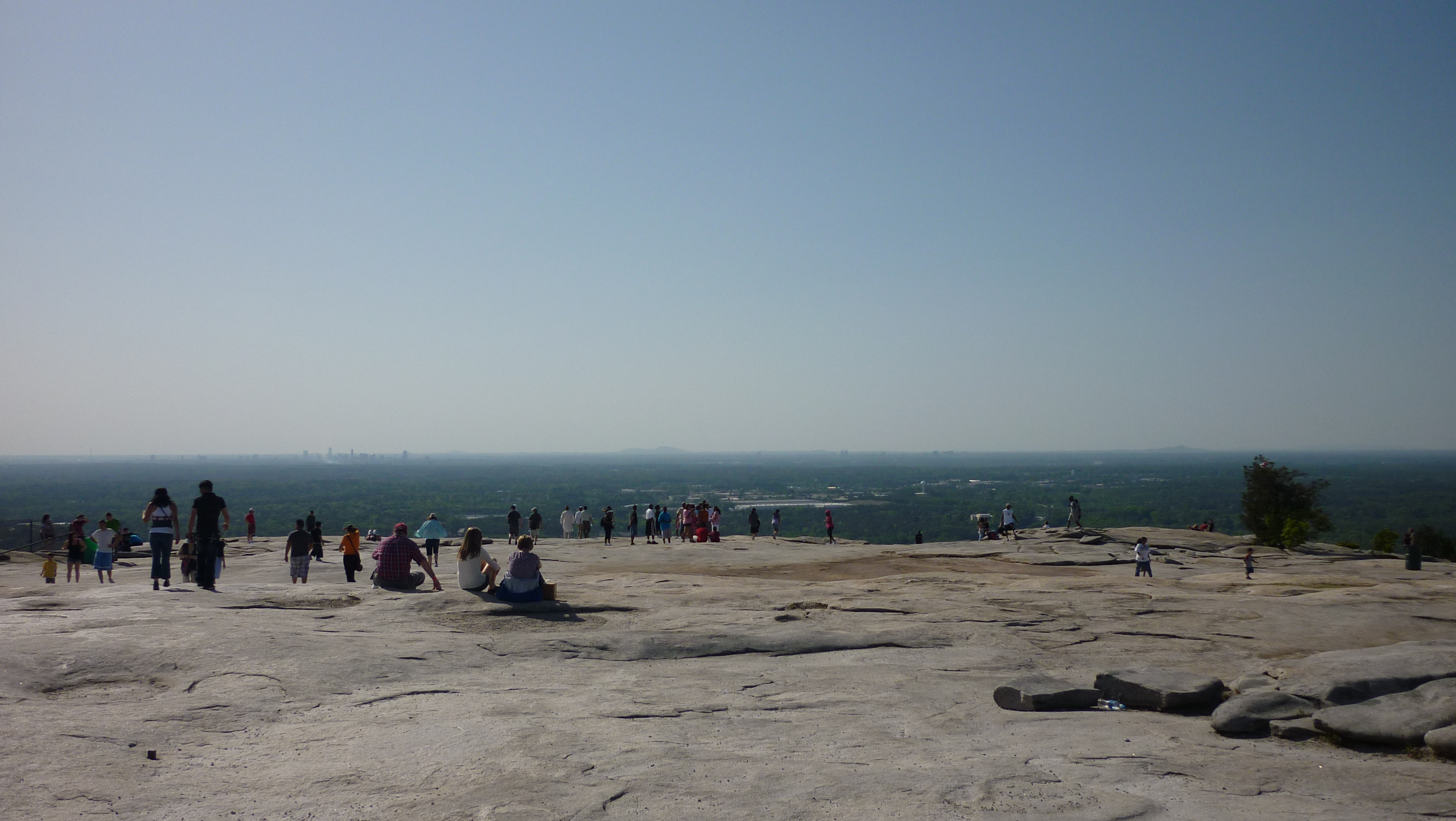
Summit of Stone Mountain, Kennesaw Mountain (center) and Atlanta (left) in background

The top of the mountain is a landscape of bare rock and rock pools, and it provides views of the surrounding area including the skyline of downtown Atlanta, often Kennesaw Mountain, and on very clear days even the Appalachian Mountains. On some days, the top of the mountain is shrouded in a heavy fog, and visibility may be limited to only a few feet.

The clear freshwater pools on the summit form by rainwater gathering in eroded depressions, and are home to unusual clam shrimp and fairy shrimp. The tiny shrimp appear only during the rainy season. Through the process of cryptobiosis, the tiny shrimp eggs (or cysts) can remain dormant for years in the dried out depressions, awaiting favorable conditions. These vernal pools are also home to several federally listed rare and endangered plant species, such as black-spored quillwort (Isoetes melanospora) and pool sprite (also called snorkelwort, Gratiola amphiantha).

The mountain's lower slopes are wooded. The rare Georgia oak was first discovered at the summit, and several specimens can easily be found along the walk-up trail and in the woods around the base of the mountain. In the fall, the Confederate yellow daisy (Helianthus porteri) flowers appear on the mountain, growing in rock crevices and in the large wooded areas. More than 120 wildflowers, most of them native to the Southern Appalachians and including several rare or federally protected species, have been identified on the mountain.

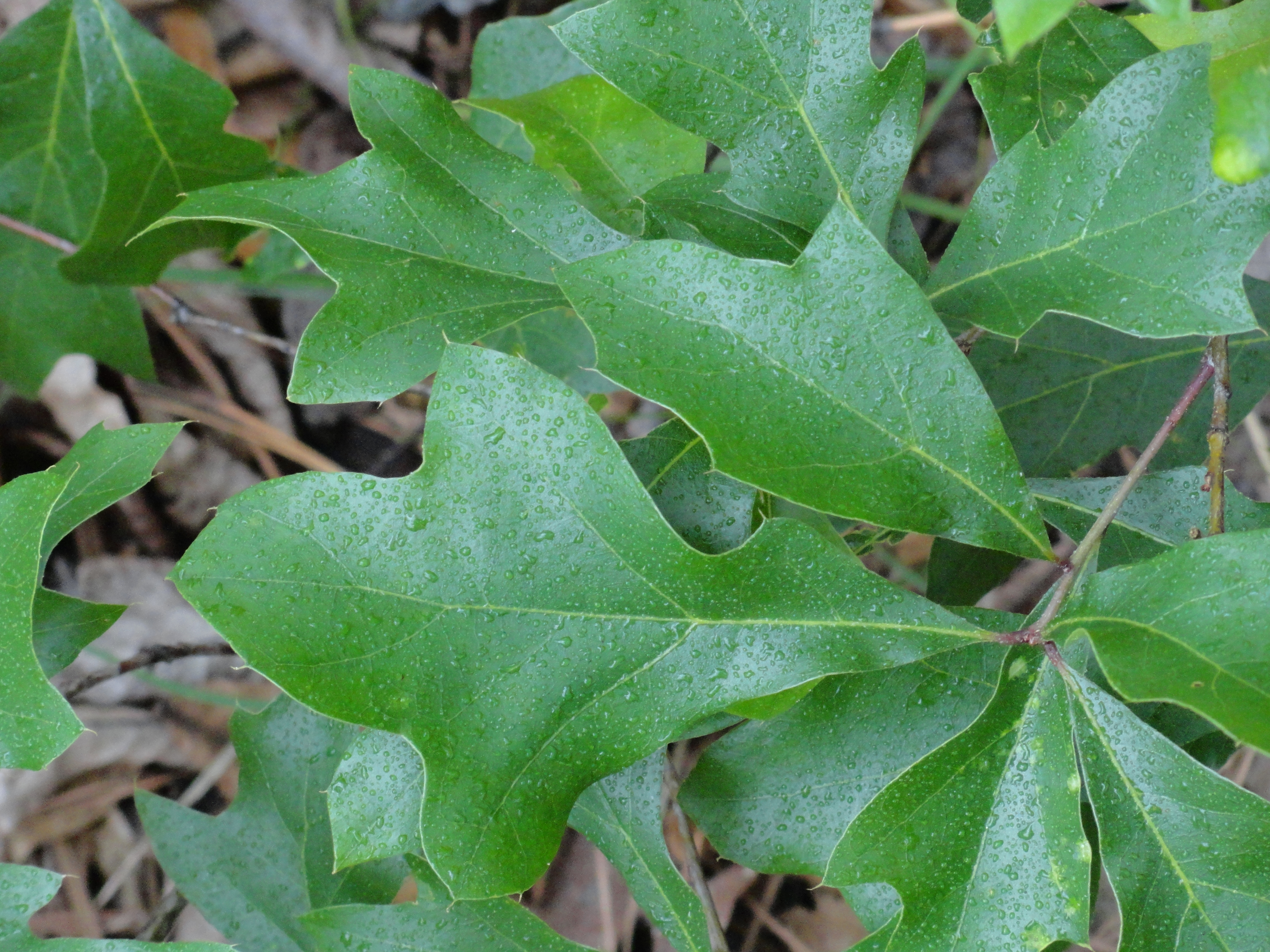
Leaves of the Georgia oak

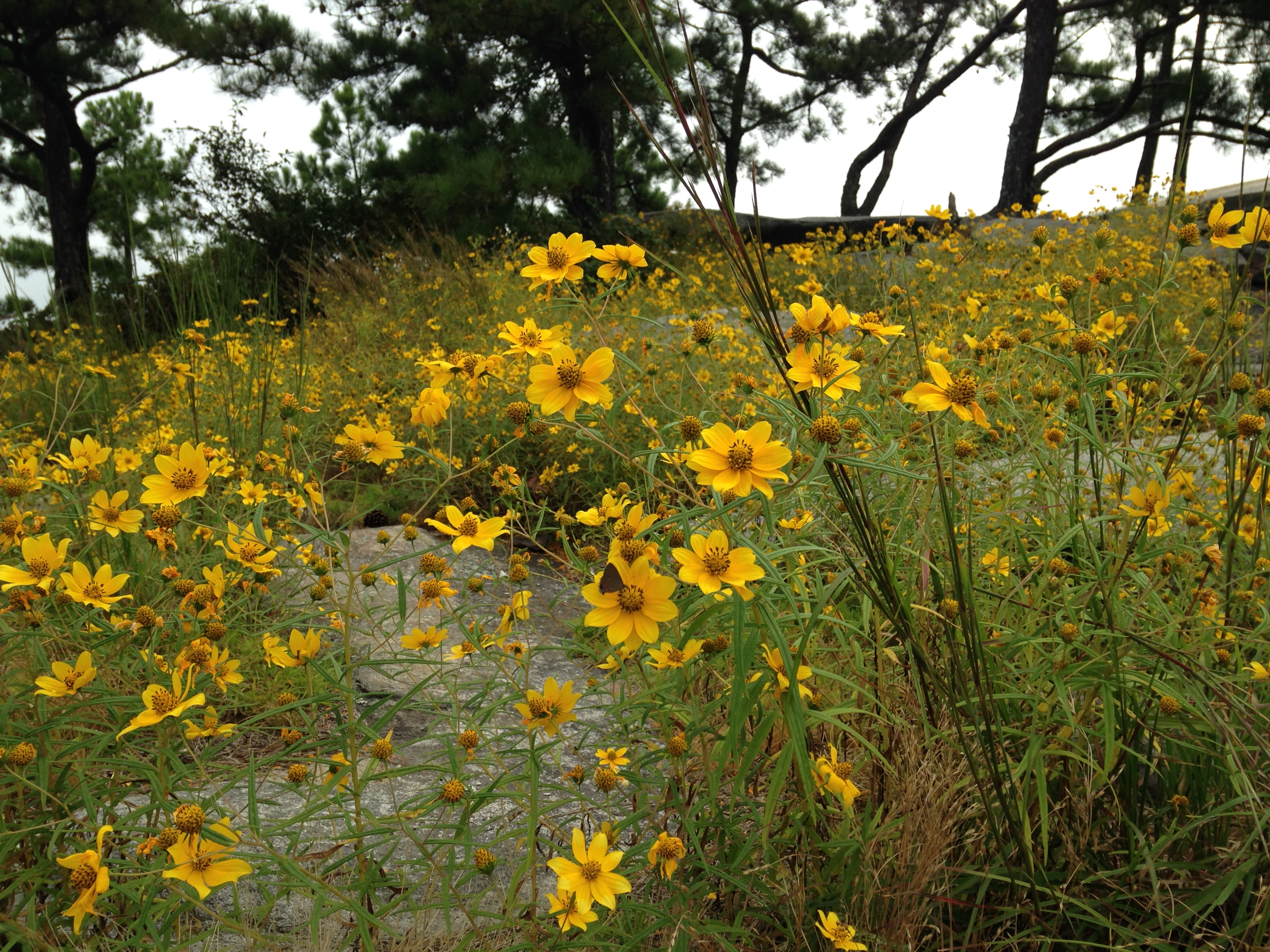
Confederate yellow daisy (Helianthus porteri)

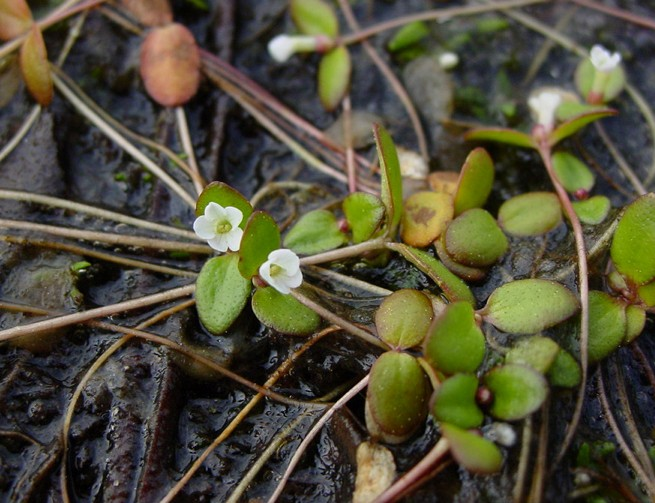
Pool sprite (Gratiola amphiantha)

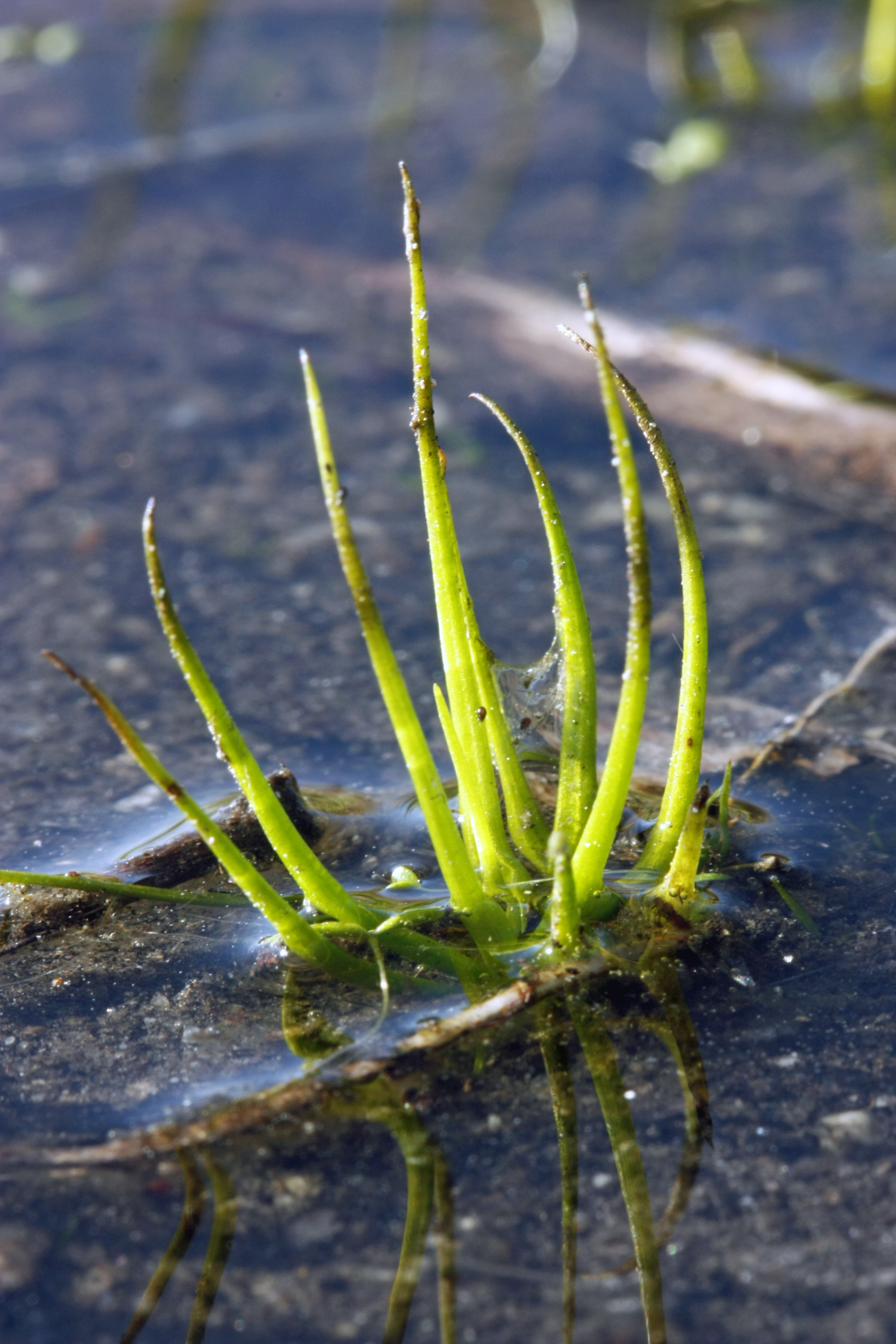
Quillwort (Isoetes melanospora)

== Confederate Memorial Carving ==
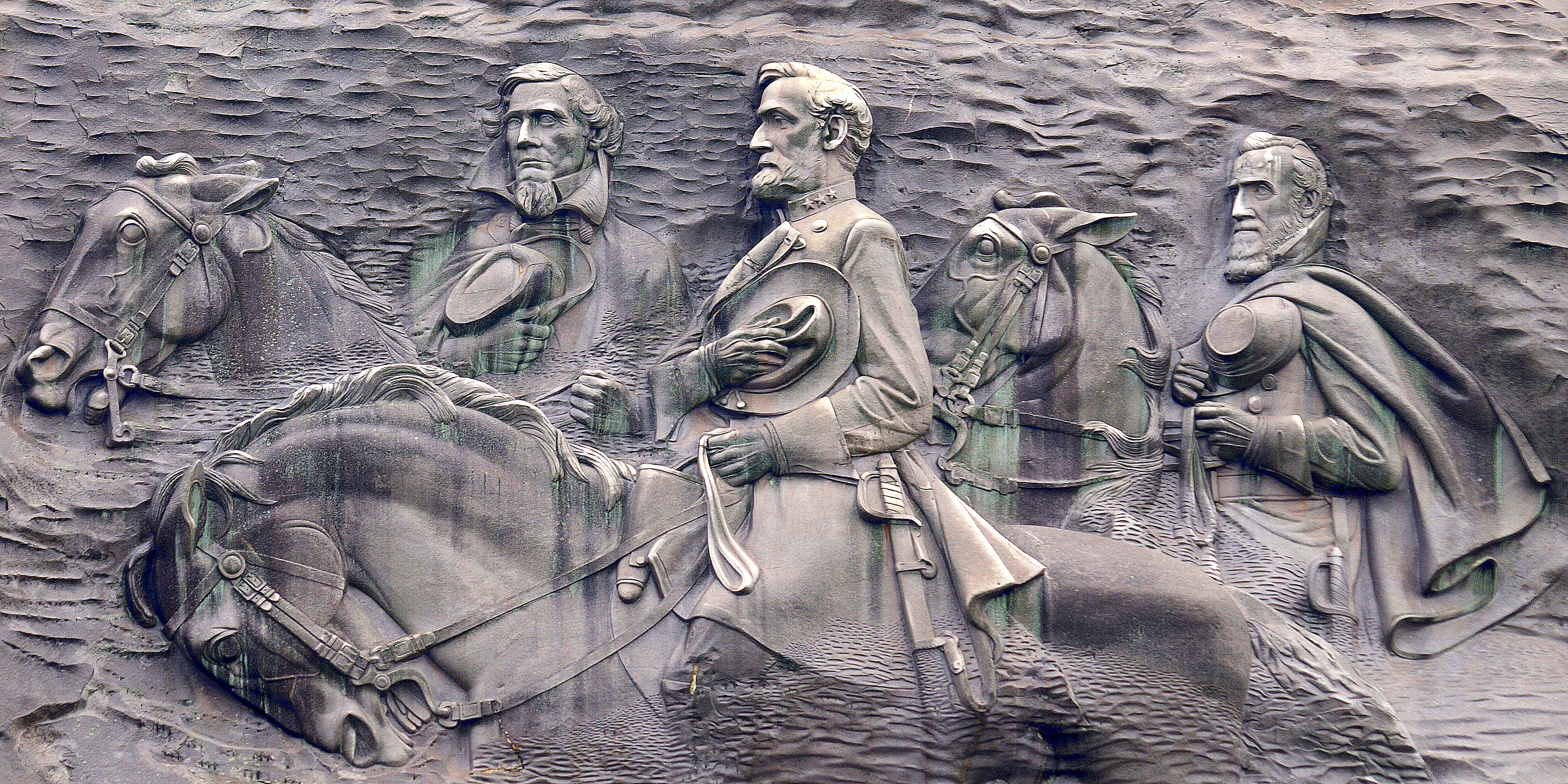
Close-up of the memorial

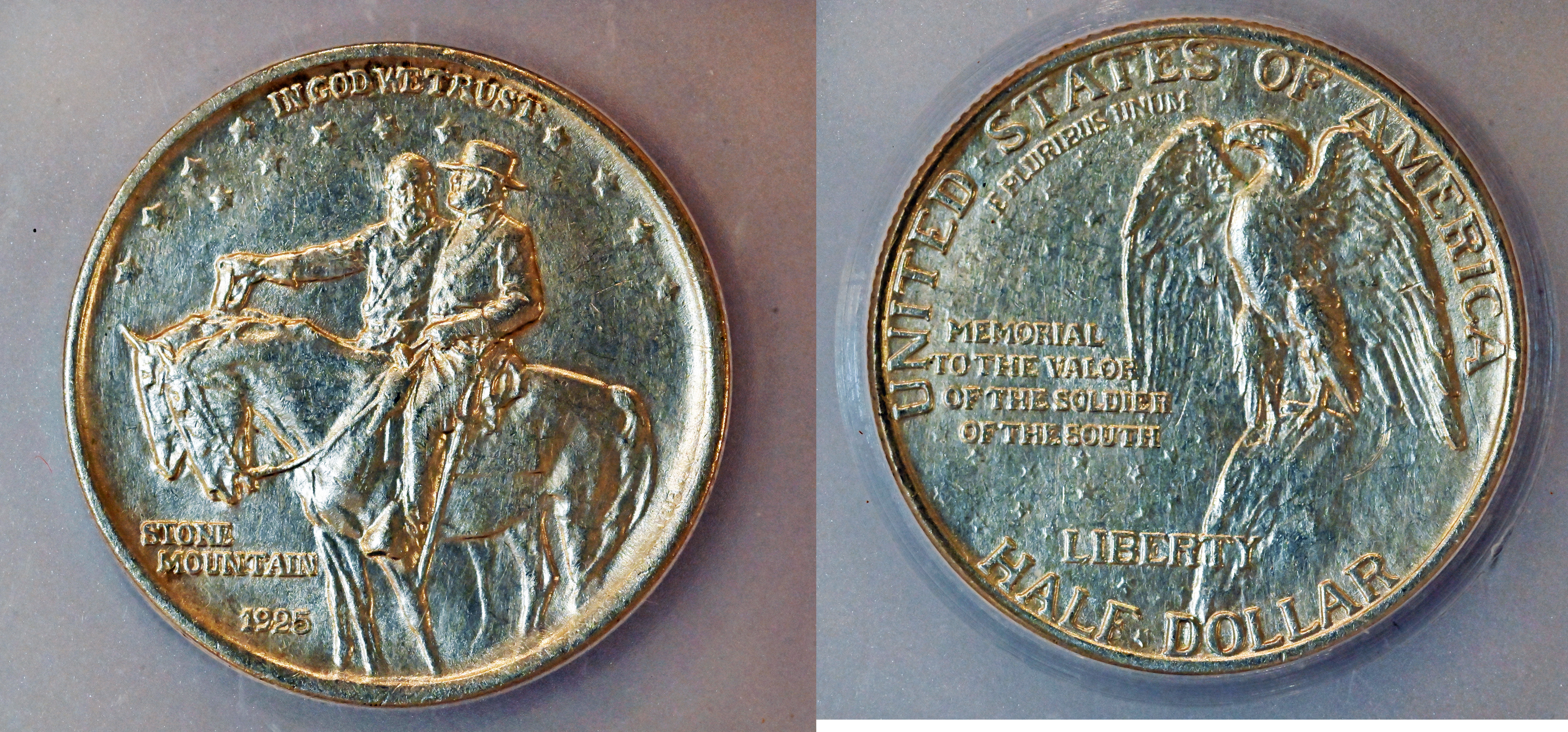
1925 Stone Mountain Memorial half dollar (design by Borglum)

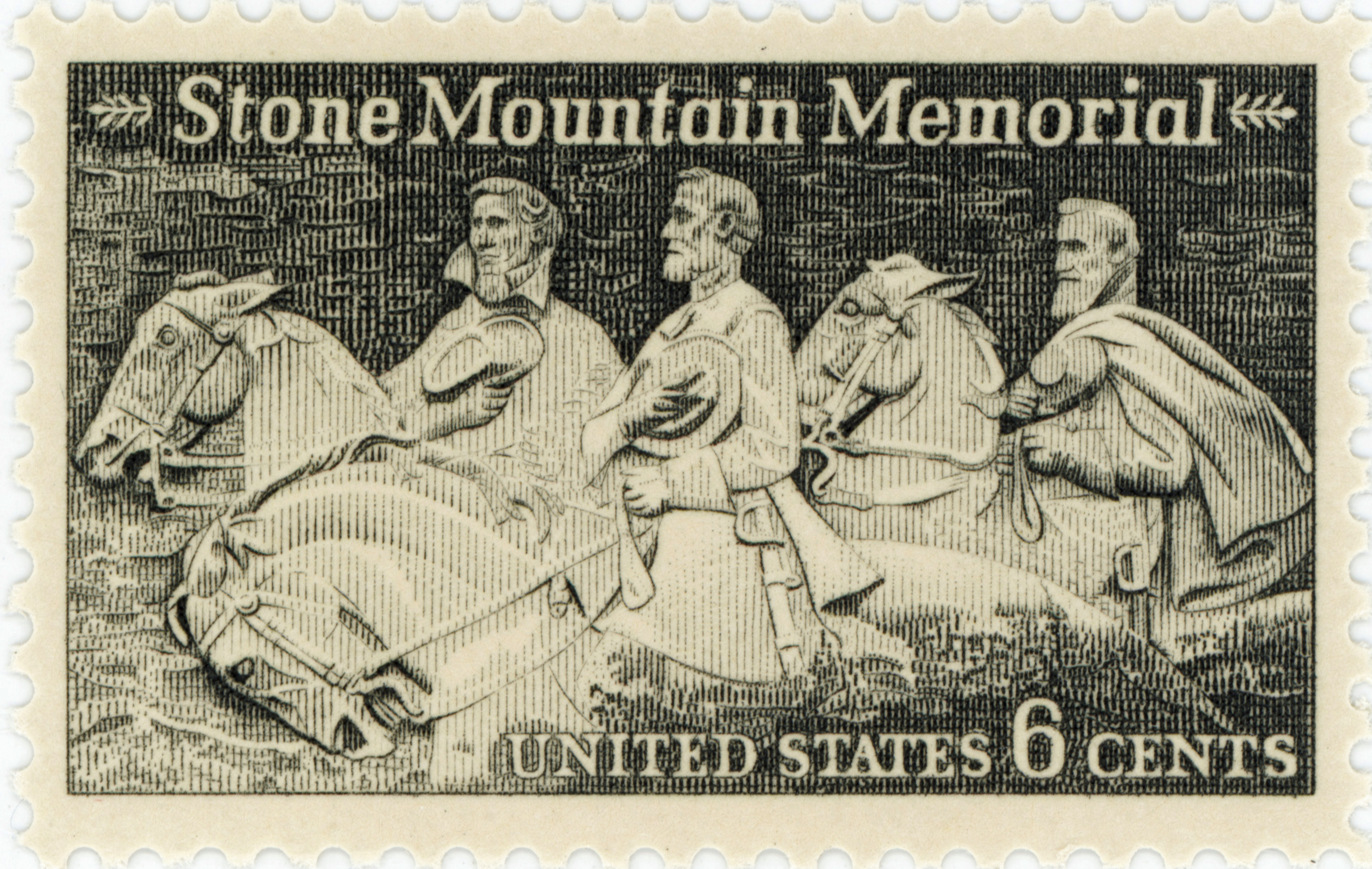
U.S. postage stamp, 1970

Advertisement for Stone Mountain in Dixie Highway magazine, May 1925

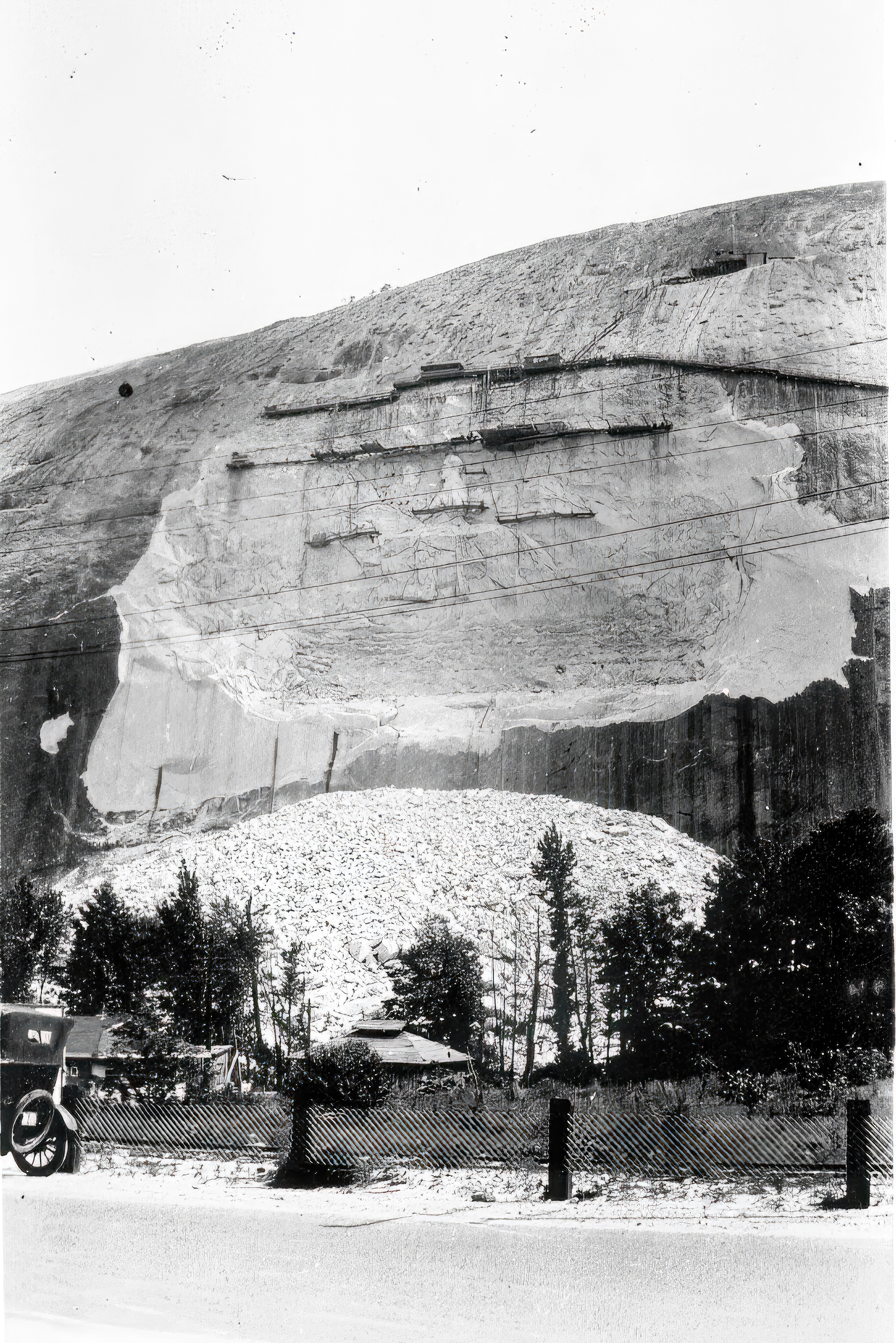
Carving in progress in 1926

Stone Mountain sculpture in process

The largest bas-relief sculpture in the world, the Confederate Memorial Carving depicts three Confederate leaders of the Civil War: President Jefferson Davis and Generals Robert E. Lee and Thomas J. "Stonewall" Jackson (on their horses, Blackjack, Traveller, and Little Sorrel, respectively). The sculpture was cut 42 feet (13 m) deep into the mountain, measures 90 feet (27 m) in height and 190 feet (58 m) in width, and lies 400 feet (120 m) above the ground.

David Freeman, writing on the origins of the memorial, states: "Who first conceived of a Confederate memorial on the side of Stone Mountain has long been a matter of debate..... The written evidence...points to Francis Ticknor, a nineteenth-century physician and poet from Jones County, Georgia...in an 1869 poem.... William H. Terrell, an Atlanta attorney and son of a Confederate veteran, ...suggested it publicly on May 26, 1914 in an editorial for the Atlanta Constitution." Three weeks later, Georgian John Temple Graves, editor of the New York American, suggested it should have a 70-foot (21 m) statue of Robert E. Lee.

The project was greatly advanced by C. Helen Plane, a charter member of the United Daughters of the Confederacy (UDC) and first president and Honorary Life President of the Georgia State Division. After obtaining the approval of the Georgia UDC, she set up the UDC Stone Mountain Memorial Association in 1914, when she was 85 years old. She convinced Samuel Venable of the Venable Brothers Granite Company, an active Klan member and owner of the mountain, to deed one side of the mountain for the project. She chose the sculptor Gutzon Borglum for the project and invited him to visit the mountain (although, despite his Ku Klux Klan involvement, she "would not shake his hand—he was, after all, a Yankee"). She met him at the Atlanta train station, took him to her family's summer home, Mont Rest, at the foot of the mountain, and introduced him to Samuel Venable,. Borglum also enlisted Luigi Del Bianco, whom he would also involve in Mount Rushmore.

Borglum's original plan was having five groups of figures, sixty-five mounted officers representing the states (to be chosen by the states), General Nathan Bedford Forrest and his cavalry—some 700 to 1,000 figures, each from 35 feet (11 m) to 50 feet (15 m) high. In addition, Borglum planned a room cut 60 feet (18 m) into the mountain, 320 feet (98 m) wide, and 40 feet (12 m) high, faced by 13 columns.

Venable deeded the north face of the mountain to the UDC in 1916, on the condition that it complete a sizable Civil War monument in 12 years. Finances as well as technical problems slowed progress. The U.S. Mint issued a 1925 Commemorative silver U.S. half dollar, bearing the words "Stone Mountain", as a fundraiser for the monument. This issue, which required the approval of both the 1926 Congress and President Calvin Coolidge, was the largest issue of commemorative coins by the U.S. government up to that time.

Financial conflicts between Borglum and the Association led to his firing in 1925. Borglum destroyed his models, claiming that they were his property, but the Association disagreed and had a warrant issued for his arrest. He was warned of the arrest and narrowly escaped to North Carolina, whose governor, Angus McLean, refused to extradite him, though he could not return to Georgia. The affair was highly publicized and there was much discussion and discord, including discord between Sam Venable, the Association and Association president Hollins Randolph. The face of Lee that Borglum had partially completed was blasted off the mountain in 1928.

After a number of sculptors turned them down, Augustus Lukeman took up the work in 1925, with a different, smaller design. Fundraising was even more difficult after the public debate and name-calling, and work stopped in 1928. In 1941, segregationist Governor Eugene Talmadge formed the Stone Mountain Memorial Association (SMMA) to continue work on the memorial, but the project was delayed once again by the United States' entry into World War II (1941–45).

In response to the 1954 Brown v. Board of Education Supreme Court ruling and the birth of the civil rights movement, in 1958, at the urging of segregationist Governor Marvin Griffin, the Georgia legislature approved a measure to purchase Stone Mountain at a price of $1,125,000. In 1963, Walker Hancock was selected to complete the carving, and work began in 1964. The carving was dedicated in a ceremony on May 9, 1970. The carving was completed by Roy Faulkner on March 3, 1972. Faulkner in 1985 opened the Stone Mountain Carving Museum (now closed) on nearby Memorial Drive commemorating the carving's history. An extensive archival collection related to the project is now at Emory University, with the bulk of the materials dating from 1915 to 1930; the finding aid provides a history of the project, and an index of the papers contained in the collection.

Four flags of the Confederacy are flown at the site. The Stone Mountain Memorial Lawn "contains...thirteen terraces—one for each Confederate state.... Each terrace flies the flag that the state flew as member of the Confederacy."

=== Replica plantation ===
In 1963, beneath the sculpture, a replica plantation whose slave quarters were described as "neat" and "well furnished" in promotional materials was opened to the public. The slaves were called "hands" or "workers", and black actress Butterfly McQueen (from Gone with the Wind) was hired to guide and inform visitors. The park states that the plantation was inspired by Gone with the Wind. "Historic Square was opened in 1963 and was originally known as Stone Acres Plantation and later as the Antebellum Plantation before being renamed Historic Square.... Historic Square's clapboard slave cabins were moved intact from the Graves Plantation near Covington, Georgia, where they were built between 1825 and 1840".

=== Involvement of the Ku Klux Klan ===
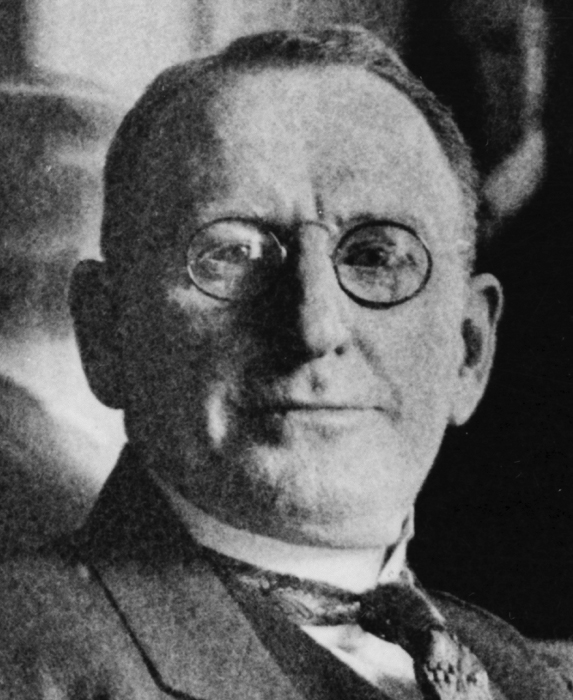
William J. Simmons founded the reborn Klan atop Stone Mountain in 1915.

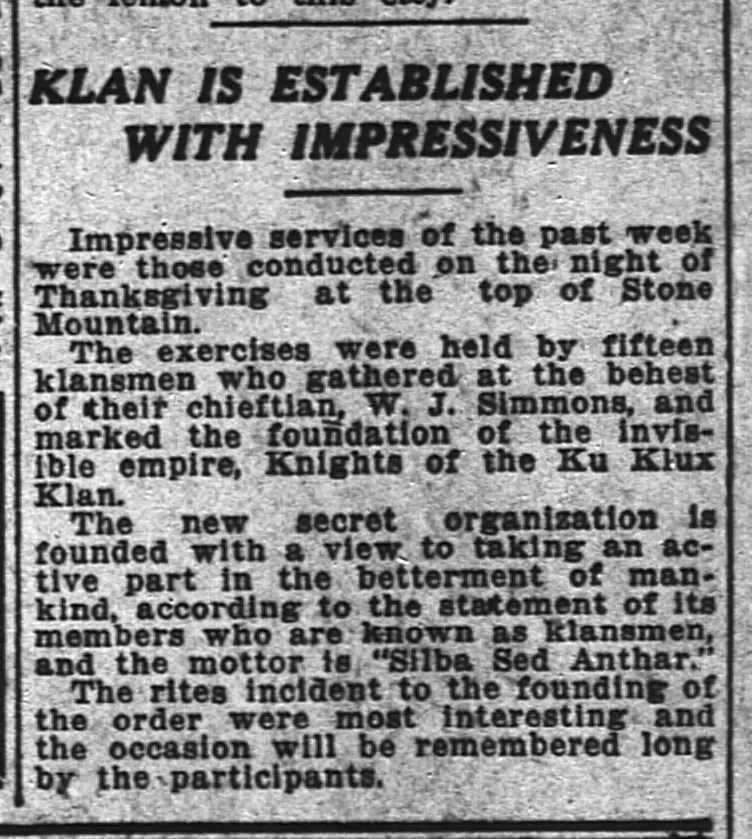
The Atlanta Constitution clipping Nov. 28, 1915, describing the Klan re-establishment atop Stone Mountain

According to sociologist James W. Loewen, Stone Mountain was "the sacred site to members of the second and third national klans." Loewen describes how the rebirth of the Ku Klux Klan—the second Klan—was inspired by D. W. Griffith's 1915 Klan-glorifying film, The Birth of a Nation. That was followed in August by the highly publicized lynching of Leo Frank, who had been convicted of murder, in nearby Marietta, Georgia. On November 25 of the same year, Thanksgiving Day, a small group, including fifteen robed and hooded "charter members" of the new organization, met at the summit of Stone Mountain to create a new iteration of the Klan. Led by William J. Simmons, it included two elderly members of the original Klan. As part of their ceremony, they set up on the summit an altar covered with a flag, opened a Bible, and burned a 16 ft (4.9 m) cross.

James R. Venable attended the 1915 revival of the KKK on top of Stone Mountain and later became an Imperial Wizard of the National Knights of the Ku Klux Klan, which was one of the later KKK factions. He owned land at the base of the mountain that he had inherited from his ancestors, and in October 1923 he granted the Klan an easement with perpetual right to hold celebrations as they desired. However, the property was condemned in 1960 at the behest of the Stone Mountain Memorial Association.

The Klan also held cross-burnings at the summit of the mountain on different occasions from 1915 onward. This practice came to an end in 1962, when the Klan attempted to hold a mountaintop cross-burning in response to the NAACP holding its national convention in Atlanta. The Stone Mountain Memorial Association did not want either group using state property for demonstrations, and convinced Governor Ernest Vandiver to order state troopers to stop the event. Seventy troopers attempted to stop several hundred Klansmen gathered at the base of the mountain from climbing to the summit, but the Klansmen were armed with billy clubs, flashlights, and stones, and greatly outnumbered the officers. The police negotiated a truce with the local Klan Grand Dragon, under which the Klansmen would refrain from further violence, but 20 of their number would be allowed to climb the mountain for a "religious ceremony", and the cross-burning was substituted with the lighting of a flare.

In August 2017, the Klan was denied a permit for a mountaintop cross-burning.

Fundraising for the monument resumed in 1923. The influence of the UDC continued, in support of Mrs. Plane's vision of a carving explicitly for the purpose of creating a Confederate memorial. She suggested in a letter to the first sculptor, Gutzon Borglum:

I feel it is due to the Klan[,] which saved us from Negro dominations [sic] and carpetbag rule, that it be immortalized on Stone Mountain. Why not represent a small group of them in their nightly uniform approaching in the distance?

The UDC established the Stone Mountain Confederate Memorial Association (SMCMA) for fundraising and on-site supervision of the project. Venable and Borglum, both closely associated with the Klan, arranged to pack the SMCMA with Klan members. The SMCMA, along with the United Daughters of the Confederacy, continued fundraising efforts. Of the $250,000 (~$3.55 million in 2024) raised, part came from the federal government, which in 1925 issued commemorative fifty-cent coins with the soldiers Robert E. Lee and Stonewall Jackson on them. The image on the back of the coin was based on The Last Meeting of Lee and Jackson, executed in 1869 by Everett B. D. Fabrino Julio, (Note: Julio was an American born in Saint Helena in 1843 who emigrated to the U.S. in 1860. He died in 1879.) itself an icon of Lost Cause mythology; it is now in the American Civil War Museum (until 2012 the Museum of the Confederacy). When the state completed the purchase in 1960, it condemned the property to void Venable's agreement to allow the Klan perpetual right to hold meetings on the premises.

=== Proposed removal of the carving ===
After the Charleston church shooting in June 2015, Stone Mountain was the subject of a political debate related to the removal of symbols of the Confederacy. This controversy was stimulated by a movement in other states to remove the Confederate battle flag and statues of Confederate leaders from public areas.

[The Confederate sculpture at Stone Mountain is] the largest shrine to white supremacy in the history of the world ... I don't think people understand the objective and the intent. They don't understand that it's based on white supremacy because the [American Civil War] was based on white supremacy, and the 'heroes' are based on white supremacy. After the killings at Emanuel Church in Charleston, it finally crystallized for me that these monuments encourage violence and validate oppression.

— Richard Rose, President of the NAACP

In July 2015, the Atlanta NAACP proposed removing the Confederate carving from Stone Mountain Park. However, this would require the approval of the Georgia Legislature, as would any change to a "military monument" in the state.

On October 11, 2015, The Atlanta Journal-Constitution reported the park was considering a proposal of a permanent "Freedom Bell" honoring Martin Luther King Jr. and the line "Let freedom ring from Stone Mountain of Georgia", from King's 1963 "I Have a Dream" speech. The proposed monument is inspired by a bell-ringing ceremony held in 2013 honoring the 50th anniversary of King's speech. It is not supported by the NAACP or the King-founded Southern Christian Leadership Conference (SCLC), who want the Confederate symbols removed rather than a King symbol added. Advance Local reported in 2015 that both the DeKalb County branch of the NAACP and the Sons of Confederate Veterans were opposed to the bell because it would have been put next to a Confederate monument. Representatives of the NAACP were quoted in the article saying "It's an attempt to gain support from blacks to keep these racist and demeaning symbols."

In August 2017, after the Unite the Right rally in Charlottesville, Virginia—a white nationalist protest against the removal of the Robert E. Lee monument and Stonewall Jackson sculpture in the city—turned violent, many people across the country again demanded the removal of Confederate monuments and memorials as part of a national political debate. Georgia State Representative and Democratic gubernatorial candidate Stacey Abrams called for the removal, by sandblasting, of Stone Mountain's carving. She called it "a blight upon our state".

=== Public opposition ===
The history of Stone Mountain as a headquarters and site of importance to the Ku Klux Klan has led to public advocacy for the removal of the monument's protected status. Under a 2001 Georgia law, historical monuments cannot be removed, as they are deemed property of the local government in which they reside. The law explicitly protects war monuments historically significant to the United States, the Confederacy of the United States, or the State of Georgia. Given this, the removal of the carving on Stone Mountain has not been successful under current laws. In addition to its status as a historical monument, Stone Mountain has additional protection under Georgia state law. Part 4 of Article 6 of Chapter 3 of Title 12 of the Official Code of Georgia still requires the SMMA to maintain Stone Mountain as a memorial to the confederacy.

In 2020, the formation of an advocacy organization, Stone Mountain Action Coalition was founded as a movement

dedicated to a more inclusive Stone Mountain Park centered on the principles of healing, transformation and progress. SMAC membership is a diverse coalition of concerned citizens, political leaders, community organizations, faith-based groups and businesses who are dedicated to supporting constructive solutions and ideas that reflect a new, shared vision for the Park.

The coalition became active in 2020 with the objectives to create a more honest portrayal of the history of white supremacy associated with Stone Mountain, and to advance the offerings of the park to attract a broader range of visitors, improving the economic viability of the park. The coalition supports the passage of Georgia state bill HB-243, which would repeal the historical mandate that Georgia operate Stone Mountain as a memorial to the Confederacy. In February 2025, the bill was introduced in the Georgia House of Representatives. The bill is currently sponsored by six Democratic state senators, including Billy Mitchell, Mary Oliver, Angela Moore, Dar'shun Kendrick, Scott Holcomb, and Karen Lupton. A similar bill, HB 794, introduced in 2023 and supported by the coalition, was stalled in the legislature and did not become law.

Other demands by the coalition are to remove the names of Confederate leaders from the streets bordering the park, issue an anti-racism statement, and refuse permits to hate groups, primarily the Ku Klux Klan, and make SMMA board meetings monthly and open to the public.

On July 5, 2020, 100 to 200 armed protesters came to Stone Mountain to call for the carving's removal. Known as the Not Fucking Around Coalition (NFAC), it was a protest against both overt and systemic racism, calling out white supremacists, with the location being chosen in part due to its history as the place where the Ku Klux Klan was re-formed.

On August 15, 2020, the park administration temporarily closed its gates in reaction to a gathering of white nationalists planned there, and the city's public buses were suspended for the day. Despite the closure of the park, a physical altercation took place downtown between a group of white nationalist protesters and far-left counter-protesters, though no injuries were reported.

In April 2025 an annual event for Confederate Memorial Day was held in the park by the Sons of Confederate Veterans. The keynote speaker was Walter Kennedy, a founding member of the League of the South and the Nationalist Front group, two far-right extremists groups responsible for organizing the 2017 Unite the Right Rally. Given its current status as a memorial to the Confederacy, it is popular assembly point for members of the Sons of Confederate Veterans (SCV) and similar organizations. SCV has applied for a permit for assembly within the park each year for the Confederate's Memorial Day event since the SMMA required an application for events. In 2021, the group was denied a permit for the event, with concerns for the spread of COVID-19 being cited, but it was granted one in subsequent years. In 2022, civil rights activists protested outside the SCV event. The annual event is controversial in the surrounding city of Stone Mountain and has drawn criticism from the local community due to public safety risks and opposition to hosting the influx of attendees.

== History ==
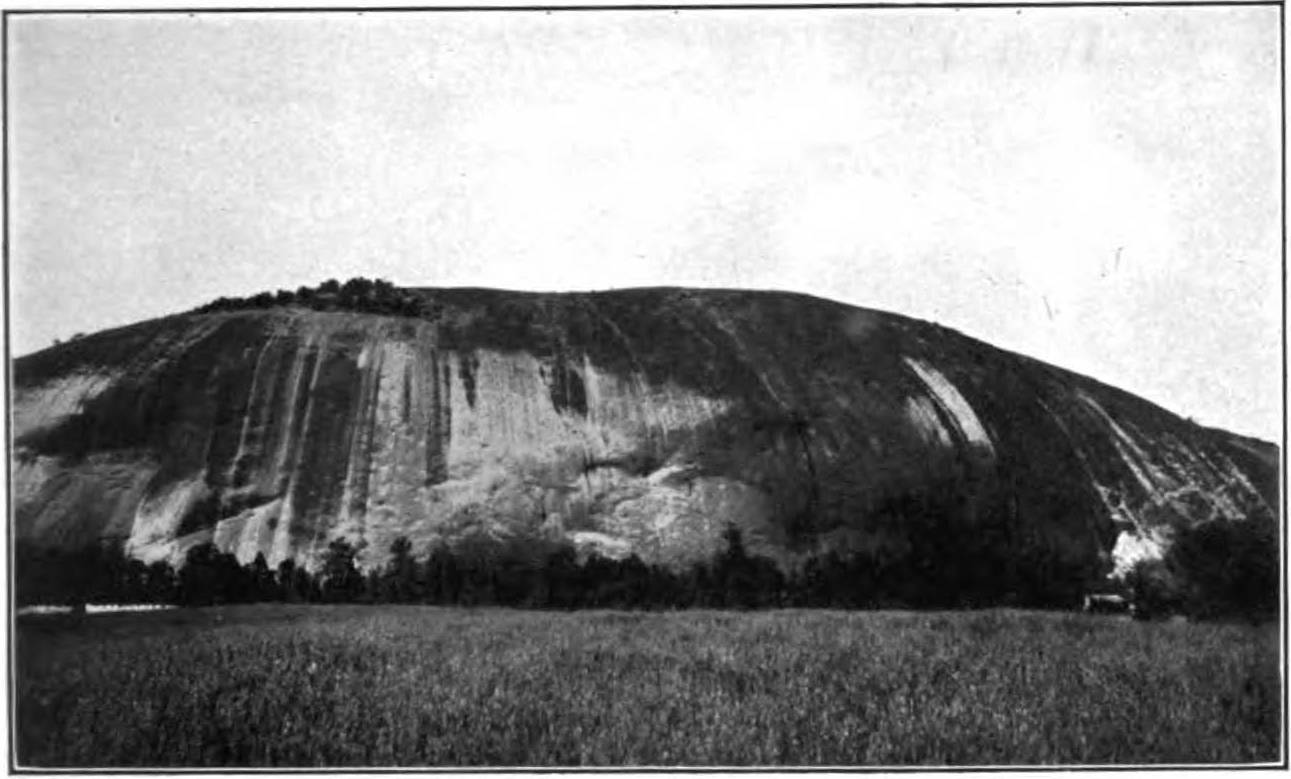
Stone Mountain, c. 1910

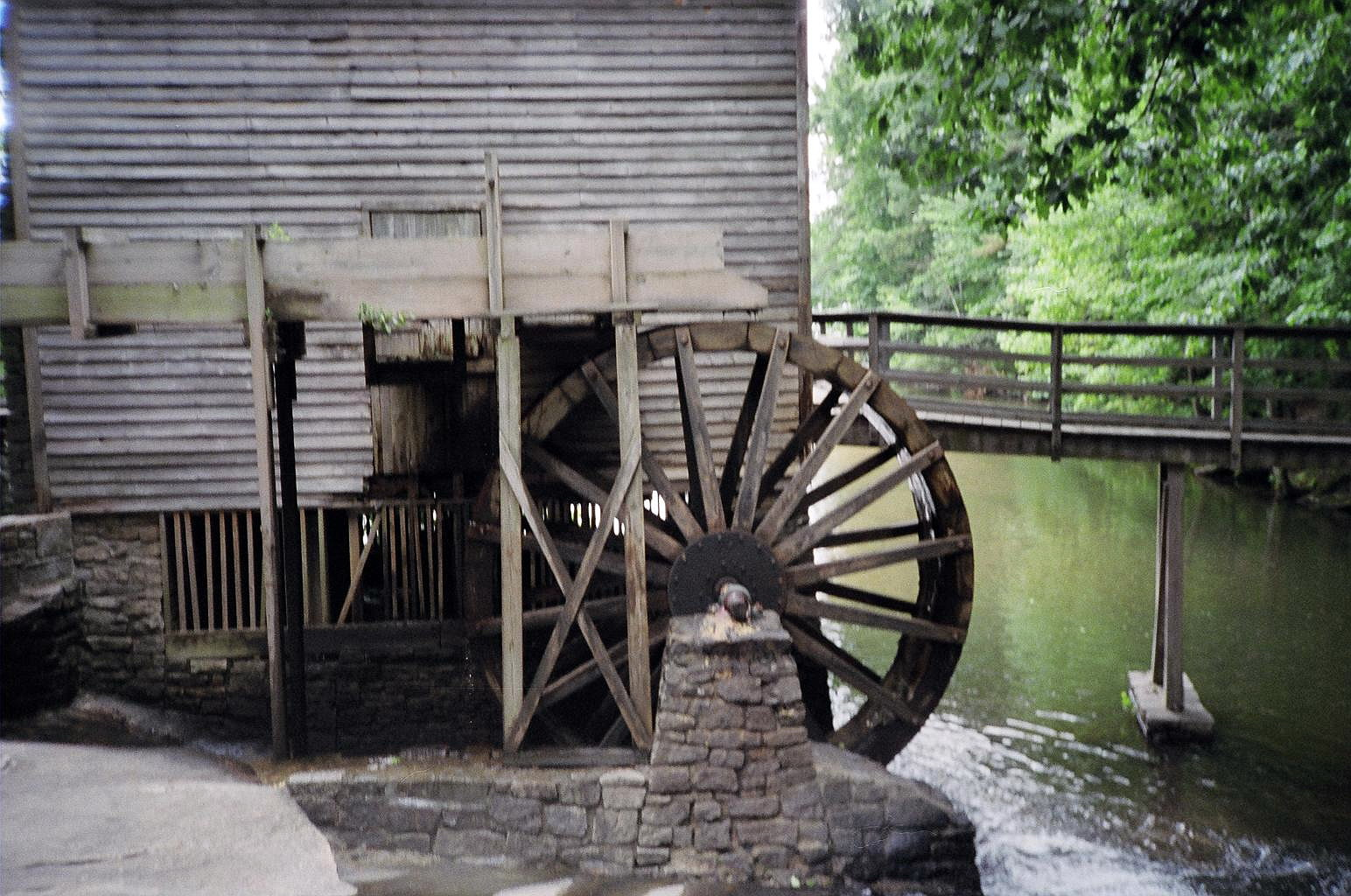
Grist Mill from 1869 at Stone Mountain

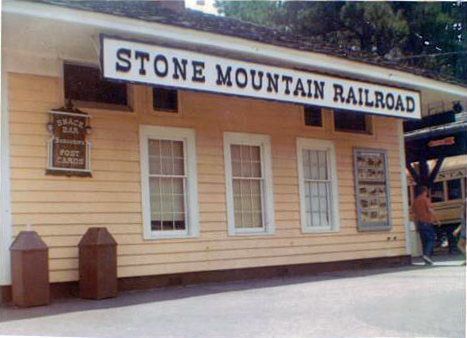
Stone Mountain Scenic Railroad depot, 1971

Human habitation of Stone Mountain and its surroundings date back into prehistory. When the mountain was first encountered by European explorers, its summit was encircled by a rock wall, similar to that still to be found on Georgia's Fort Mountain. The wall is believed to have been built by early Native American inhabitants of the area, although its purpose remains unclear. By the beginning of the 20th century, the wall had disappeared, the rocks having been taken away by early visitors as souvenirs, rolled down the rockface, or removed by the commercial quarrying operation. The mountain was the eastern end of the Campbellton Trail, a Native American path that ran through what is now the Atlanta area.

Europeans first learned of the mountain in 1567, when Spanish explorers were told of a mountain farther inland which was "very high, shining when the sun set like a fire." By this time, the Stone Mountain area was inhabited by the Creek and (to a lesser extent) Cherokee peoples.

In the early 19th century, the area was known as Rock Mountain. After the founding of DeKalb County and the county seat of Decatur in 1822, Stone Mountain was a natural recreation area; it was common for young couples on dates to ride to the mountain on horseback. The mountain is easy to climb and there has been a path since the nineteenth century.

Entrepreneur Aaron Cloud built a 165 foot (50 m) wooden observation tower at the summit of the mountain in 1838, but it was destroyed by a storm and replaced by a much smaller tower in 1851. Visitors to the mountain would travel to the area by rail and road, and then walk up the 1.1-mile (1.8 km) mountaintop trail to the top, where Cloud also had a restaurant and club.

Granite quarrying started at Stone Mountain in the 1830s, but became a major industry following the completion of a railroad spur to the quarry site in 1847. This line was rebuilt by the Georgia Railroad in 1869. Over the years, Stone Mountain granite was used in many buildings and structures, including the locks of the Panama Canal, the steps to the East Wing of the United States Capitol and the Imperial Hotel in Tokyo. In recent years, granite suppliers in Georgia sent stone samples cut from Stone Mountain to the group responsible for planning the Martin Luther King Jr. Memorial in Washington, D.C.; the foundation later chose to use granite imported from China. Quarrying during earlier periods also destroyed several spectacular geological features on Stone Mountain, such as the Devil's Crossroads, which was located on top of the mountain.

In 1887, Stone Mountain was purchased for $45,000 by the Venable Brothers of Atlanta, who quarried the mountain for 24 more years, and descendants of the Venable family would retain ownership of the mountain until it was purchased by the State of Georgia in 1958.

Martin Luther King Jr. mentioned the monument in his "I Have a Dream" speech at the August 1963 March on Washington for Jobs and Freedom, when he said "let freedom ring from Stone Mountain of Georgia!"

During the 1996 Summer Olympics, Stone Mountain Park provided venues for Olympic events in tennis, archery and track cycling. The venues for archery and cycling were temporary and are now part of the songbird and habitat trail.

Some of the outdoor scenes for the Netflix series Stranger Things were filmed in the park.

=== Aviation incidents ===
According to George Weiblen's annotated calendar for Monday, May 7, 1928: "Mail plane crashed on mountain at 8:00 P.M." The pilot, Johnny S. Kytle (1905–1931), not only survived the crash, but managed to grab the mail and walk down the mountain.

Around dusk on September 16, 2003, in clear weather, a small airplane circled the mountain five times, crashed headlong into the south side, and burst into flames. The pilot was killed. A witness testifying at the NTSB investigation stated that the pilot, a 69-year-old accountant, had threatened on multiple occasions to commit suicide by flying into the mountain. The official NTSB accident report lists the probable cause as "the pilot's intentional flight into the ground for the purpose of suicide while impaired by alcohol."

=== Governance ===
Stone Mountain Park, which surrounds the Confederate Memorial, is owned by the state of Georgia and managed by the Stone Mountain Memorial Association (SMMA), a Georgia state authority. As of August, 2022, the board entered a 10-year contract (with the option to renew for up to 30 years) with Thrive Attractions Management Group, LLC, to operate park attractions. The SMMA retains ownership, while Thrive keeps 2% of the annual gross revenues from the park's hotels and 3% of gross revenues from other areas.

From 1999 to 2022, park attractions were managed by Herschend Family Entertainment Corporation, which had a 30-year contract to operate attractions. Under terms of a 1999 agreement, Herschend paid the state of Georgia $11 million (~$19.4 million in 2024) annually, while the Stone Mountain Memorial Association had the right to reject any project deemed unfit. In 2018, Herschend Family Entertainment Corporation decided to end their contract early after only 20 years due to record losses in 2017 and 2018, citing decreased revenues and "protests and division" fueled by the park's ubiquitous Confederate imagery as factors. Bids for a new management company for Stone Mountain Park were submitted in October 2021. Thrive Attractions Management Group, LLC, started by the previous Vice President of Herschend Family Entertainment Corporation and general manager of Stone Mountain Park for 10 years, Michael Dombrowski, submitted the only bid to the SMMA, which was approved on May 23, 2022.

Since 2022, Thrive Attractions has jointly managed the park alongside the SMMA in a public-private partnership. In the years following management change, the park has operated at a financial loss. In April 2025, it was reported in a public board meeting that the park is operating at a $1.6 million loss for the year. The Board reported no receipt of funds from Thrive Attractions. The current CEO is Bill Stephens and the Chair of the Board of Directors is Reverend Abraham Mosley.

In February 2026, The SMMA and Thrive Attractions announced their intention to end Thrive's operating contract effective May 31, 2026. On March 30, 2026 SMMA announced Stone Mountain Hospitality LLC, a subsidiary of Aramark Destinations would take over the operation of the park effective June 1, 2026.

== Places of interest ==
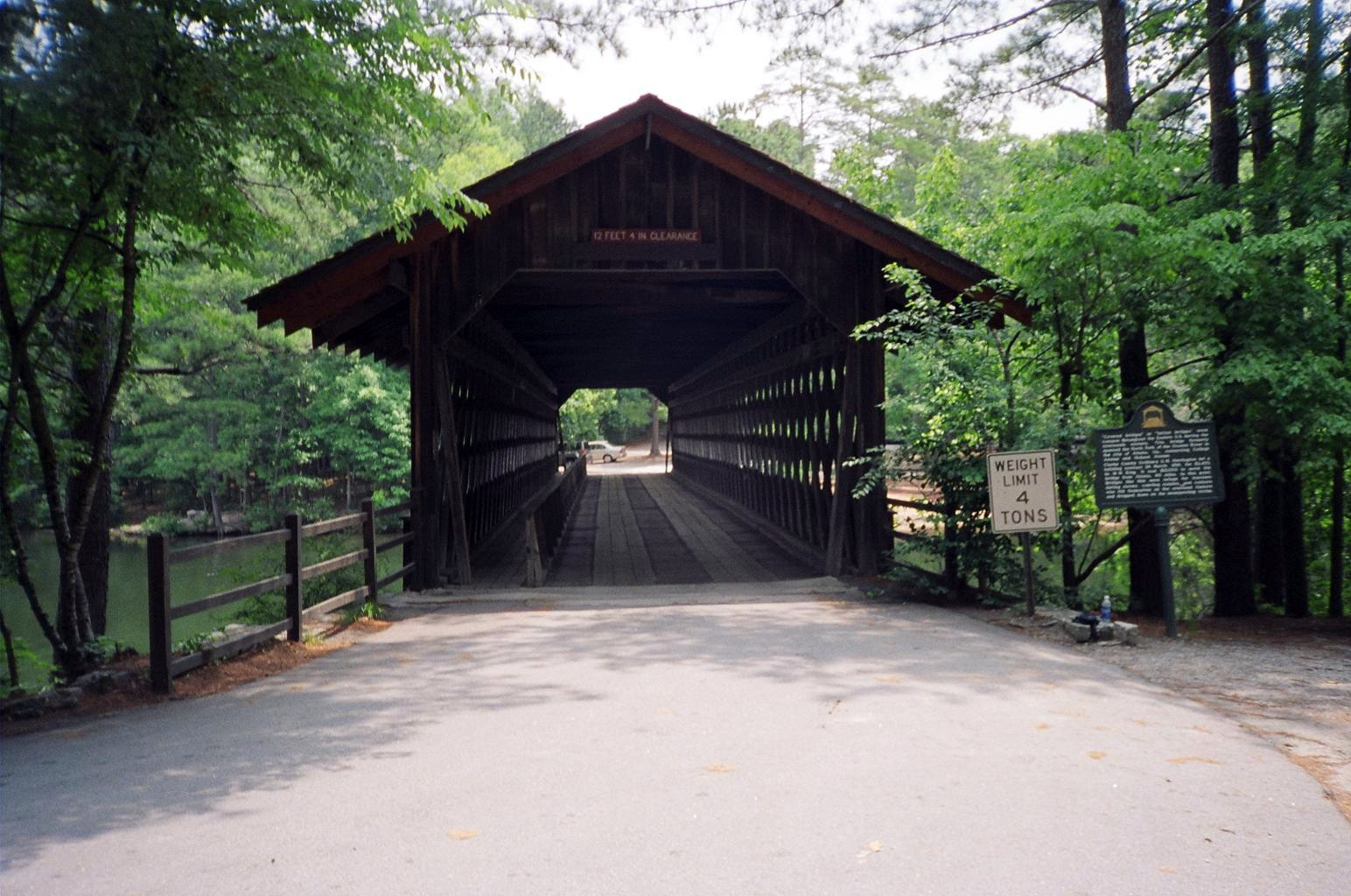
Covered bridge at Stone Mountain

Confederate Hall, operated directly by the Stone Mountain Memorial Association (SMMA), is a museum that educates students and park guests on the geology and ecology of Stone Mountain as well as historical aspects of the area. A small theater shows a historical documentary about the Civil War in Georgia called The Battle for Georgia.

The education department is host to thousands of students each school year, teaching the subjects of geology, ecology, and history. Classes are designed to meet the Georgia Performance Standards and the North American Association for Environmental Education guidelines.

Historic Square (formerly The Antebellum Plantation and Farmyard) is an open-air museum composed of 19 historic buildings, built between 1790 and 1875, that have been re-erected on the site to represent a pre-Civil War Georgia plantation. The historic houses have been furnished with an extensive collection of period furniture and decorations. The farm features a petting zoo.

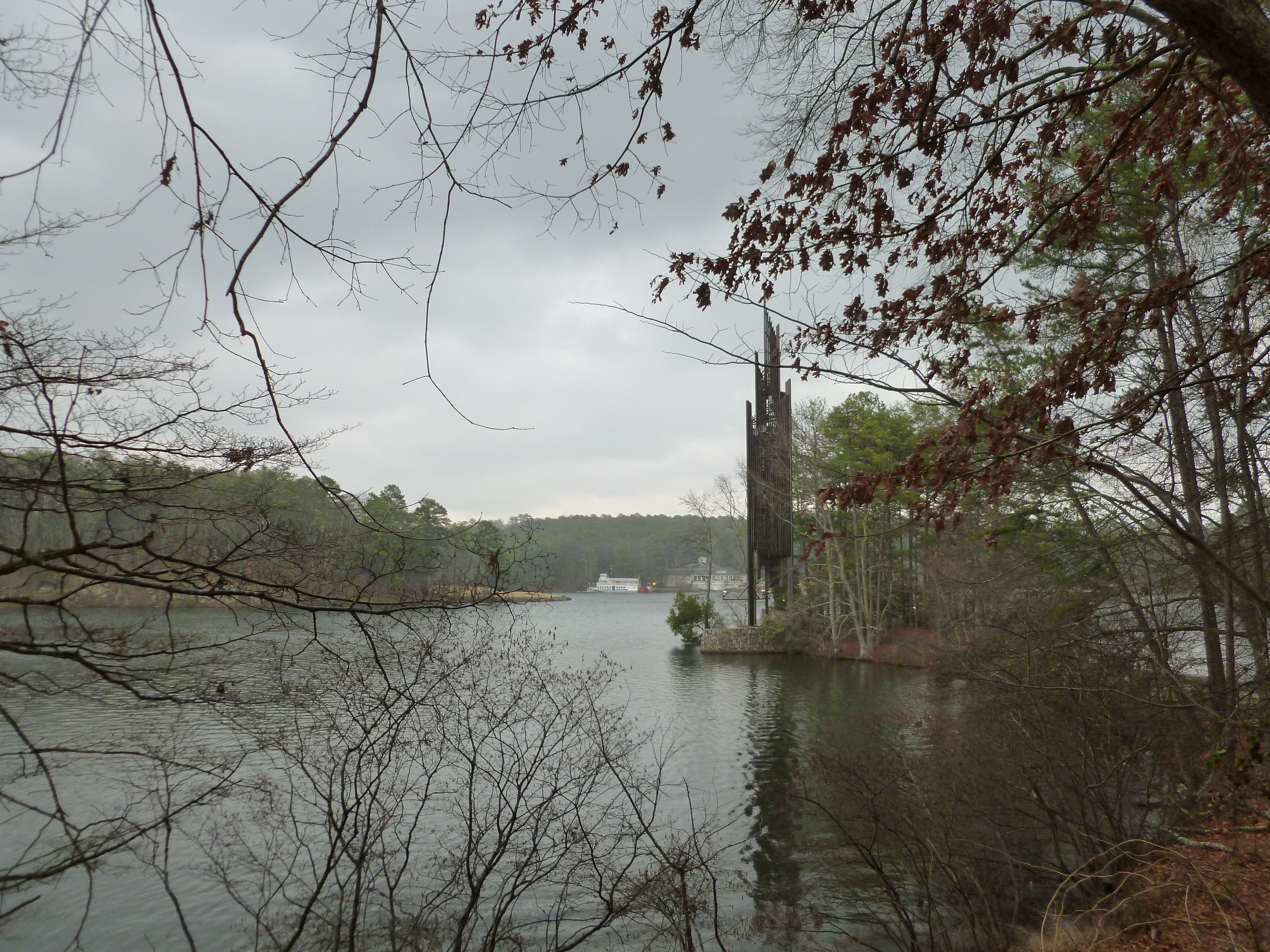
Carillon at Stone Mountain Park, January 2012

A grist mill dates from 1869 and was moved to the park in 1965. A covered bridge dates from 1892 and originally spanned the Oconee River in Athens, Georgia.

The park provides daily concerts on a large carillon that originated at the 1964 New York World's Fair. The instrument consists of 732 bell-tone rods, electronically amplified through 60 speakers in a decorative 13-story structure.

=== Broadcast tower ===
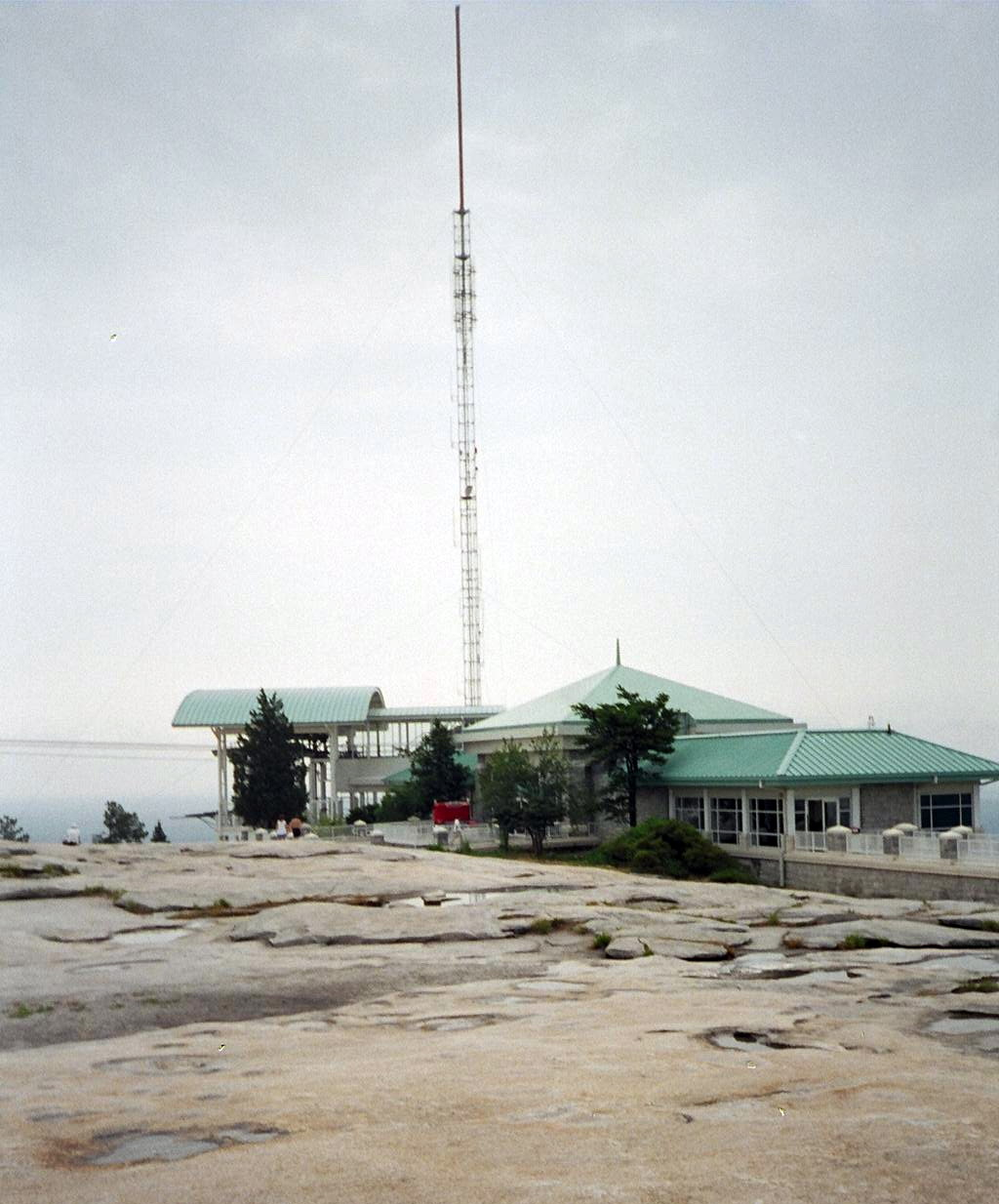
Pavilion and transmitting tower at the summit of Stone Mountain

The short broadcast tower on the top of the mountain transmits two non-commercial stations: television station WGTV TV 8, and weather radio station KEC80 on 162.55 MHz. FM radio station WABE FM 90.1 was located on this tower from 1984 until 2005, when it was required to relocate to accommodate WGTV's digital conversion. W266BW FM 101.1 now has a permit as well. Atop the tower also sits the W4BOC amateur radio repeater, which operates on a frequency of 146.760 MHz. The tower is also used for the park's Project 25 two-way radio systems.

=== Stone Mountain trails ===
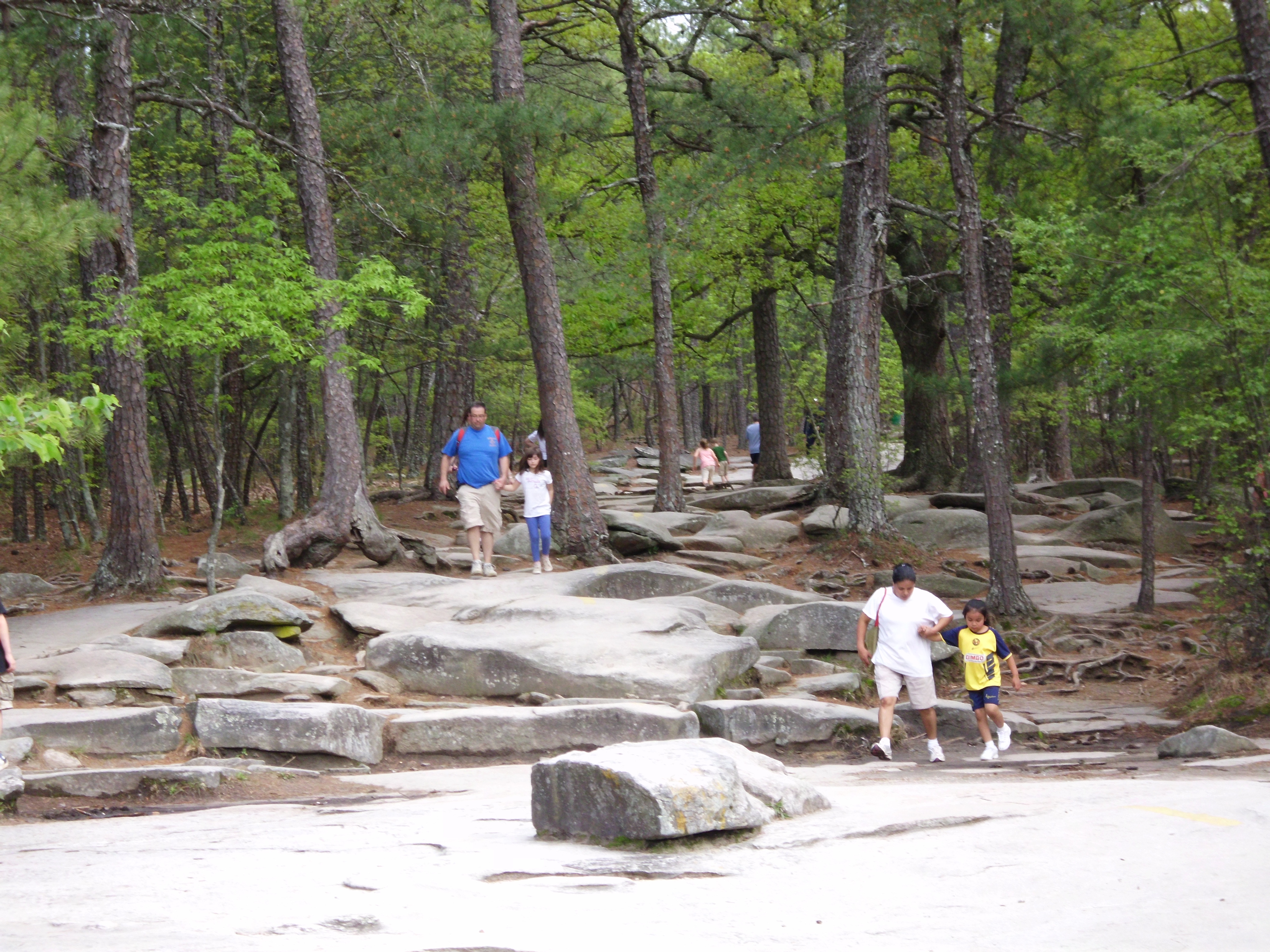
Stone Mountain walk-up trail

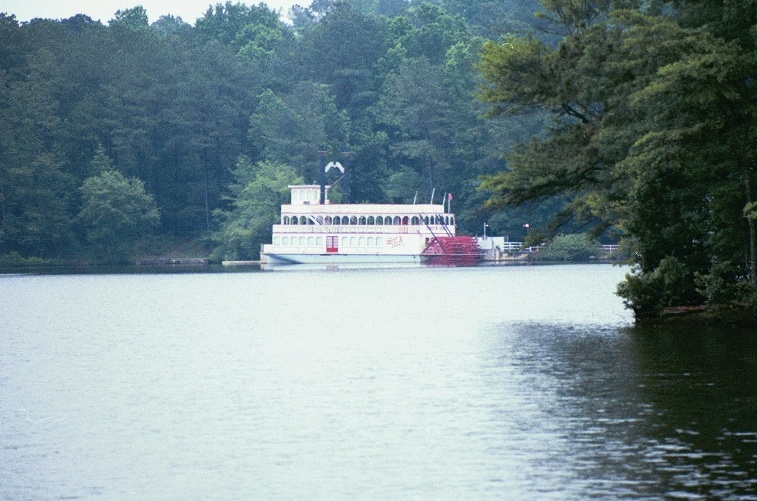
Stone Mountain riverboat

Walk Up Trail is a 1.3-mile (2.1 km) trail to the top of Stone Mountain ascending 786 ft (240 m) in elevation to a height of 1,686 ft (514 m). The trail is steep, but spectacular panoramic views and cool winds await hikers at the top.

Cherokee Trail is an 8-mile (13 km) National Recreation Trail. It loops around the mountain base, with a mile section going up and over the west side of the mountain (crosses Walk Up Trail). It passes primarily through an oak-hickory forest, but views of the lakes, streams, and mountain are common.

Nature Garden Trail is a scenic 3/4 mile (1.2 km) loop trail through a mature oak-hickory forest community. It is excellent for viewing shade-loving native plants. A small garden with interpretive native plant signs is at the entrance to the trail.

Songbird Habitat Trails consists of two loop trails each running 1 mile (1.6 km). The field trail is a birding spot and the woodland trail provides shade and numerous native plants. Dogs are not allowed.

=== Park attractions ===
The park is located in Stone Mountain, Georgia off of Highway 78. The park is located at 1000 Robert E. Lee Boulevard in Stone Mountain. Two other streets which intersect with Robert E. Lee Boulevard and encircle the Stone Mountain Park hold the names of the Confederate general Stonewall Jackson and Confederate commander-in-chief Jefferson Davis.

As of May 2025, the park is jointly managed by SMMA and Thrive Attractions. The park features several attractions. The Skyride, a Swiss-built cable car to the summit of the mountain, passes by the carving on the way up.

Historic Square is a collection of historic buildings relocated from around the state of Georgia, including three plantation houses dating from 1794, 1850 and 1845; two slave cabins; a barn; and other outbuildings. The Historic Square Farmyard features historic breeds of sheep, goats and pigs. Atlanta architect James Means, investor Christie Bell Kennedy, and antiques dealer Kenneth Garcia chose, moved, arranged, altered, and decorated the buildings between 1960 and 1963. Modeled after Colonial Williamsburg, the commercial concession originally opened as the "Antebellum Plantation".

Crossroads is a recreation of an 1872 Southern town with several attractions that include a modern 4-D movie theater, an adventure mini-golf course and a duck-tour ride. The duck boats have been replaced by the Rockin' Land and Lake Tour in 2019 due to several deaths in other locations caused by duck-boat accidents. The tour includes a ride on a double-decker open-top bus and a pontoon boat ride at the marina. There are stores and restaurants. Craft demonstrators include glass blowing and candy-making.

The Dinotorium is a children's activity area that features 65 interactive games, climbing structures, trampoline floors and slides. Sky Hike is a family ropes adventure course; Geyser Towers is a playground featuring a large fountain at the entrance.

On summer evenings, the mountain hosts the Stone Mountain Laser Show Spectacular, a fireworks and laser lighting display. The laser light show projects images of the Deep South as well as Georgia history onto the Confederate Memorial carving. During Memorial Day Weekend of 2011, Stone Mountain unveiled its overhaul of the laser show, dubbed Mountainvision, which incorporates digital projections, lasers, special effects, and pyrotechnics. On Memorial Day Weekend of 2023 Stone Mountain park officially retired the Laser Show to make way for the brand new Music Across America Light Show. The Laser Show currently runs on selected nights as of 2023.

== Documentary ==
Monument: The Untold Story of Stone Mountain is a 2022 documentary made by the Atlanta History Center.

== See also ==
- List of colossal sculptures in situ
- Stone Mountain Memorial half dollar
