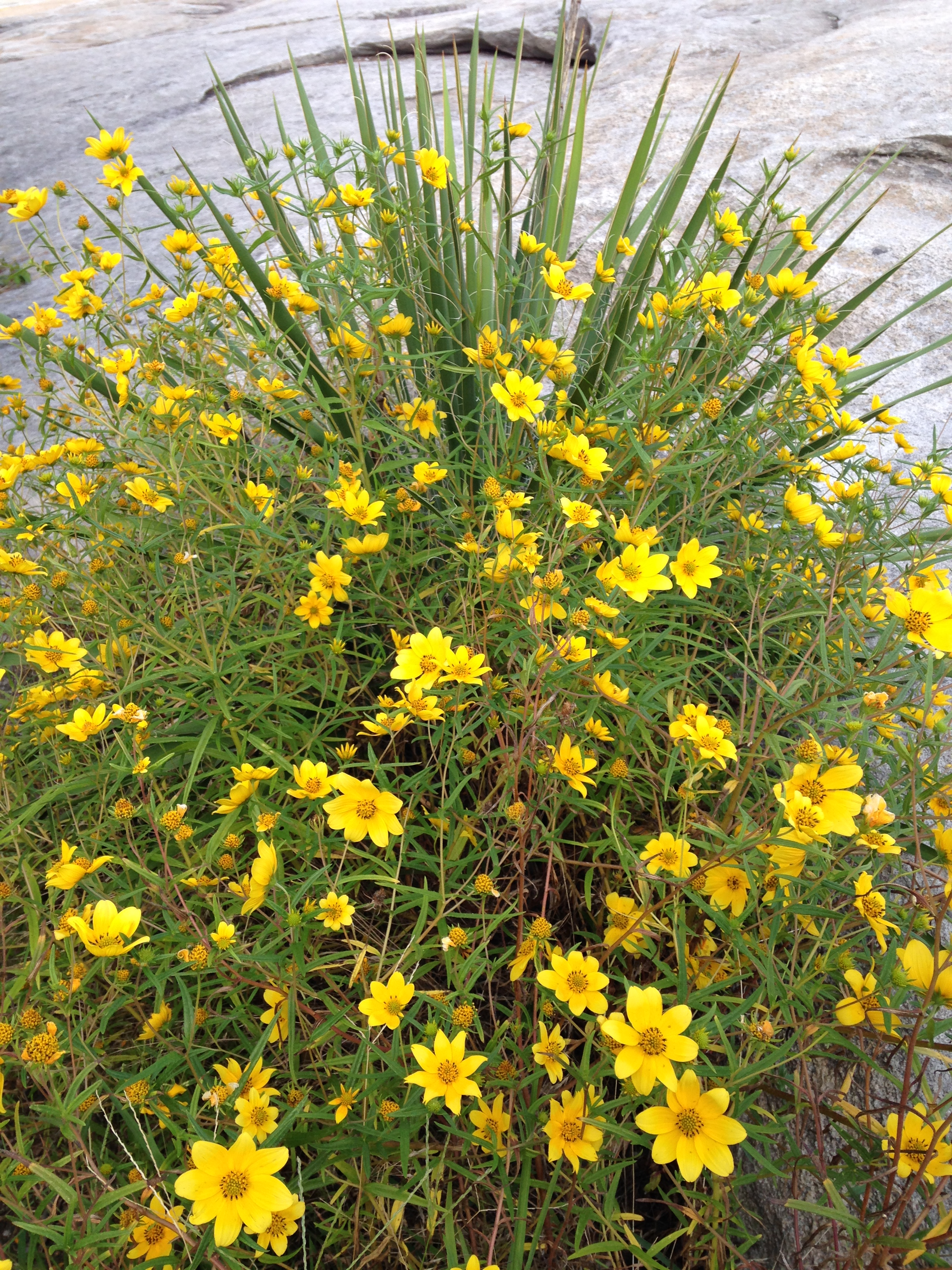
- Helianthus porteri on Stone Mtn.

Scientific classification
- Kingdom: Plantae
- Clade: Tracheophytes
- Clade: Angiosperms
- Clade: Eudicots
- Clade: Asterids
- Order: Asterales
- Family: Asteraceae
- Tribe: Heliantheae
- Genus: Helianthus
- Species: H. porteri

Binomial name
- Helianthus porteri (A.Gray) Pruski 1998 not (A.Gray) Heiser 1978 (1978 name not validly published)

Synonyms
- Gymnolomia porteri (A.Gray) A.Gray; Heliomeris porteri (A.Gray) Cockerell; Rudbeckia porteri A.Gray; Viguiera porteri (A.Gray) S.F.Blake

= Helianthus porteri =

Porter's sunflower, also known as Stone Mountain or Confederate daisy

Species of sunflower

Helianthus porteri is a species of sunflower known by the common names Porter's sunflower, Stone Mountain daisy and Confederate daisy. The term "daisy" is imprecise because the species is a sunflower (Helianthus) rather than a daisy (Bellis and related genera). Likewise, although the plant grows on Stone Mountain, GA, its range extends well beyond. The connection to the Confederacy is through Stone Mountain which contains a confederate monument, although the connection is tenuous as the species was named before the Civil War in 1849 by Harvard botanist Asa Gray in honor of Thomas Conrad Porter, a Pennsylvanian minister and botanist who collected the plant in Georgia. Gray initially named the plant Rudbeckia porteri, later changed to Helianthus in 1998 by John F. Pruski.

The species is native to the southeastern United States, including Alabama and Georgia, but has been introduced to granite outcrop areas in North Carolina as an aggressive weed. Helianthus porteri grows on thin soils on and around flat rock granite and gneiss outcrops. It is an annual herb up to 100 cm (40 inches) tall. One plant usually produces 5 or more flower heads, each containing 7 or 8 yellow ray florets surrounding 30 or more yellow disc florets.
