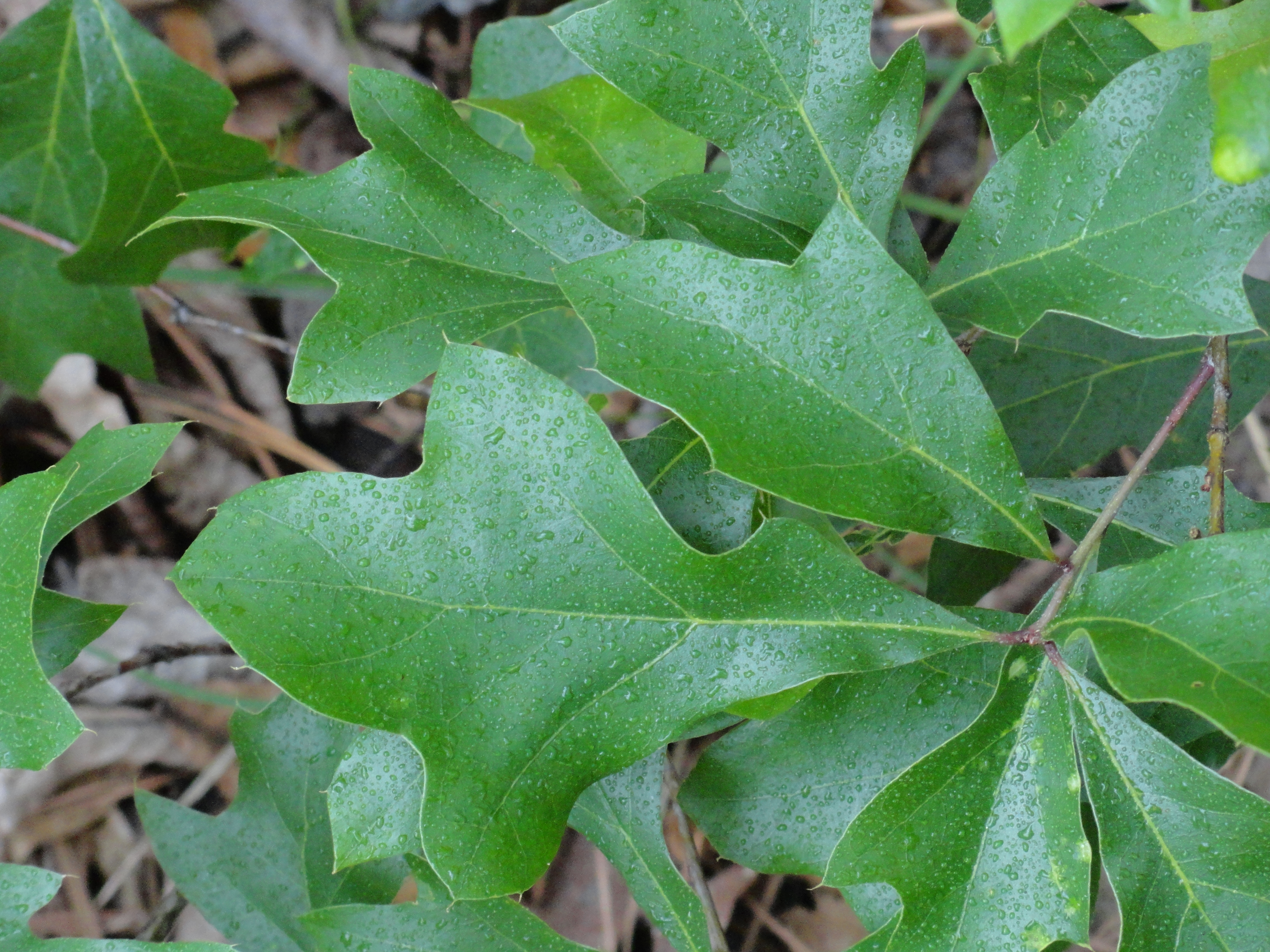
- Georgia oak leaves

Conservation status
- Endangered (IUCN 3.1)

Scientific classification
- Kingdom: Plantae
- Clade: Tracheophytes
- Clade: Angiosperms
- Clade: Eudicots
- Clade: Rosids
- Order: Fagales
- Family: Fagaceae
- Genus: Quercus
- Subgenus: Quercus subg. Quercus
- Section: Quercus sect. Lobatae
- Species: Q. georgiana

Binomial name
- Quercus georgiana M.A.Curtis
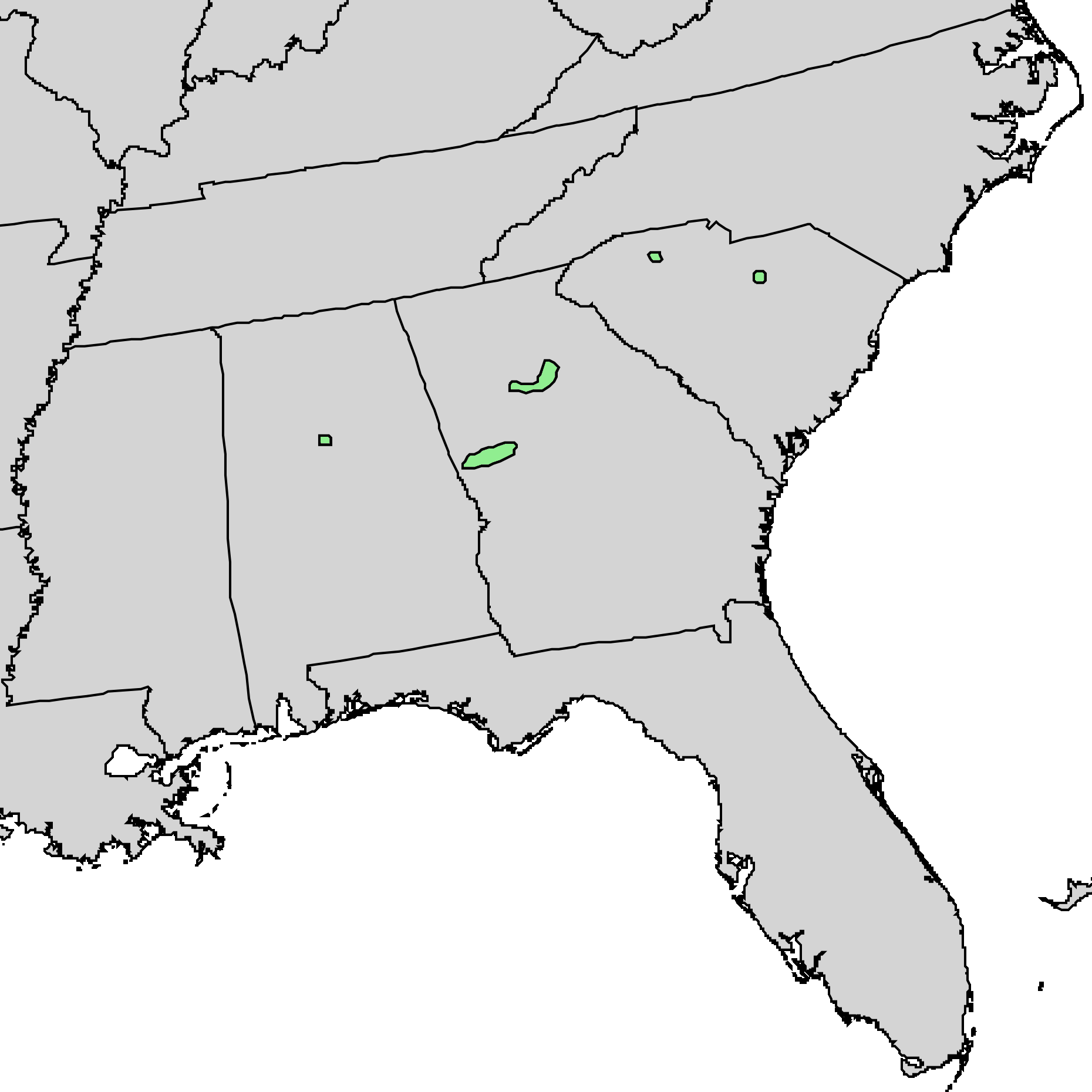
- Natural range

= Quercus georgiana =

Georgia oak

Species of oak tree

Quercus georgiana, the Georgia oak or Stone Mountain oak, is a rare deciduous red oak, native to the southeastern United States.

== Description ==
Quercus georgiana is a small tree, often shrubby in the wild, growing to 8–15 meters (26–49 feet) tall. It is classified in the red oak section Quercus sect. Lobatae.

=== Leaves ===
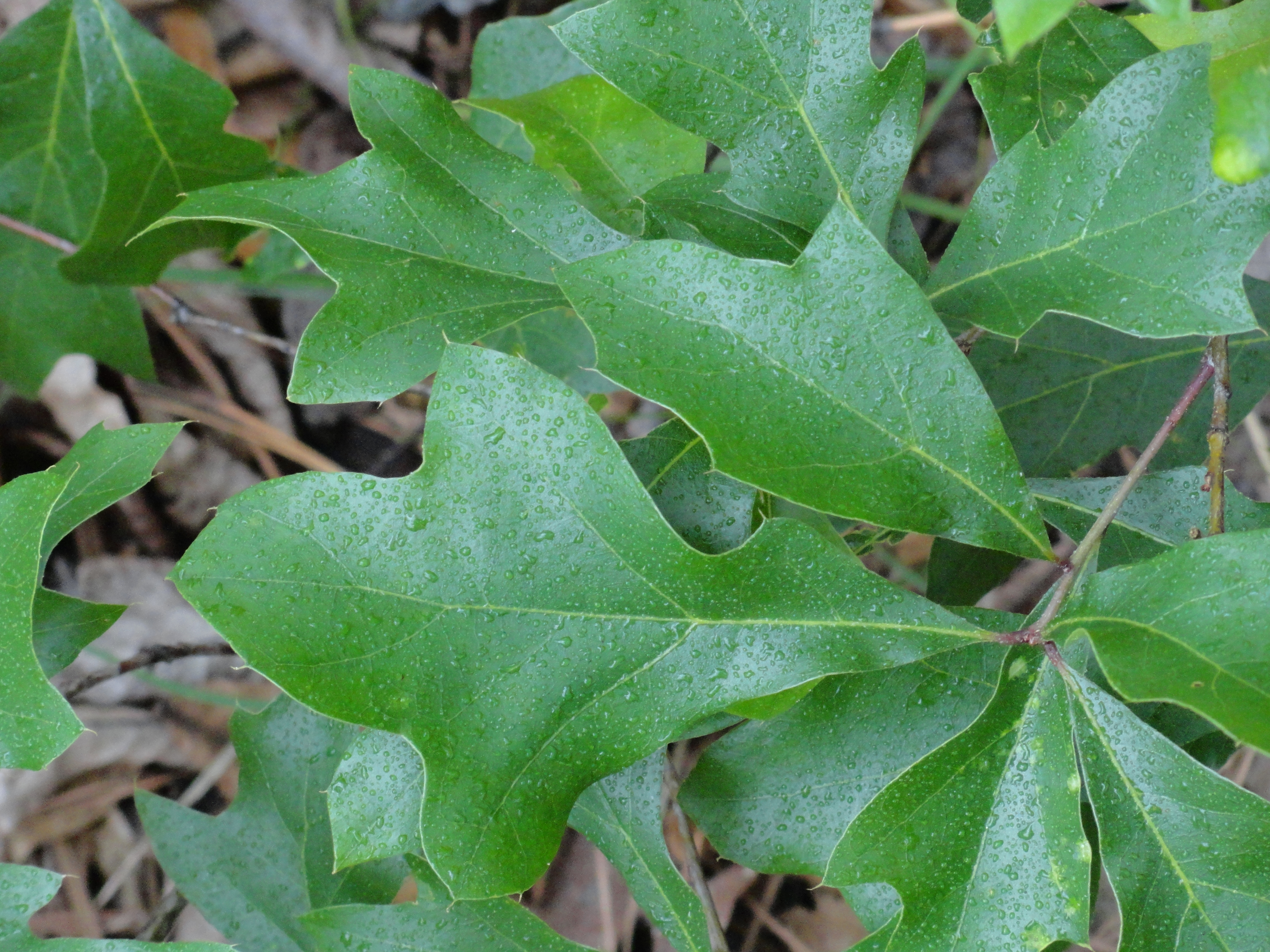
Quercus georgiana leaves

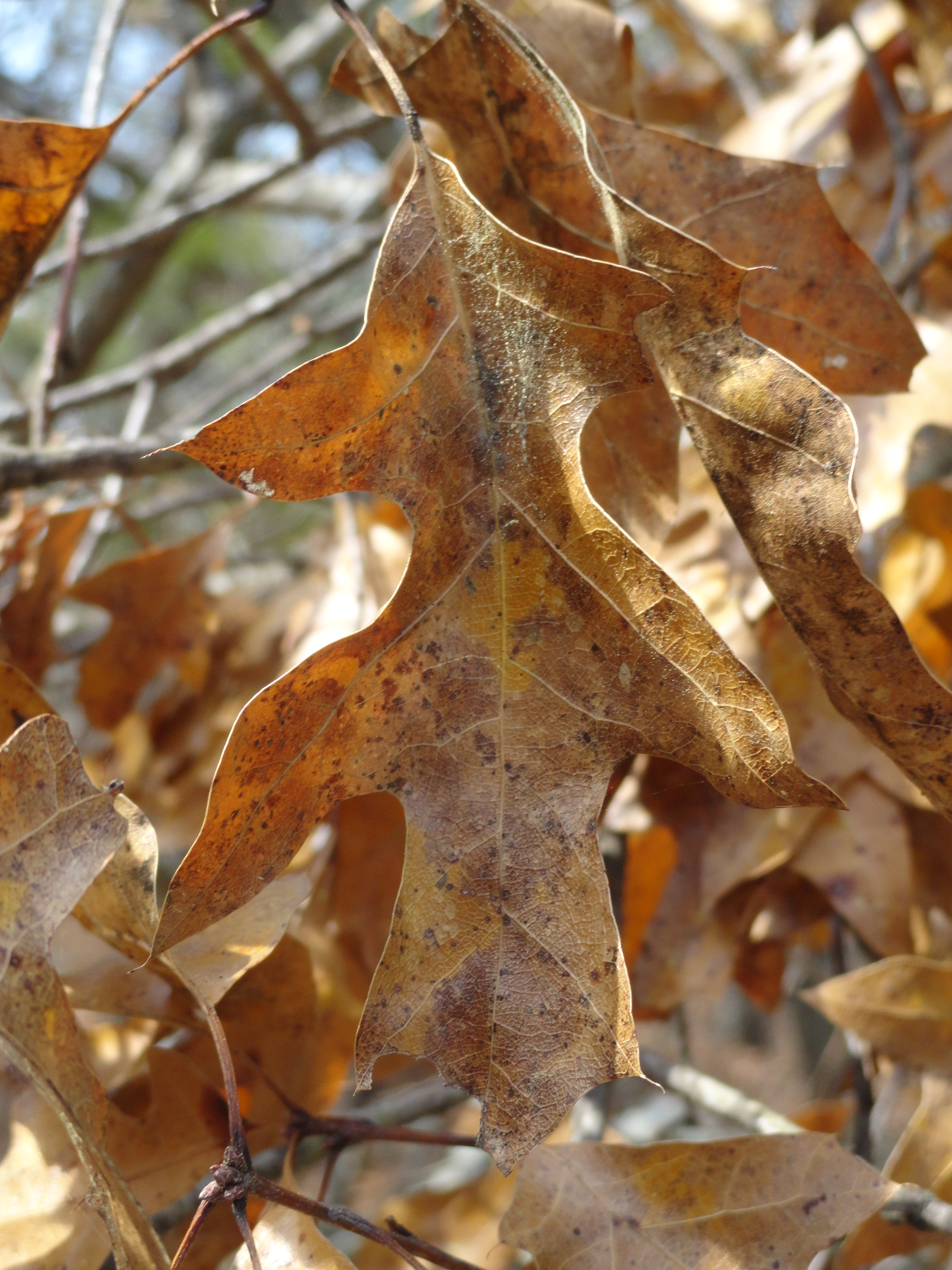
Brown winter leaves on Georgia oak

The shiny green leaves are 4–13 centimeters (1 1/2–5 inches) long and 2–9 cm (1–3 1/2 in) wide, with a 0.6–2.3 cm (1/4–1 in) petiole, and five irregular, pointed, bristle-tipped lobes; they are glabrous (hairless), except for small but conspicuous tufts of hairs in the vein axils on the underside. The leaves turn dark red to brown in the autumn, stay on the tree throughout the winter, and fall as the new leaves bud in the spring.

=== Flowering and fruiting ===
Like all oaks, flowering and leaf-out occur in late spring when all frost danger has passed. The flowers are monoecious catkins which, being self-incompatible, require the presence of another oak for pollination.

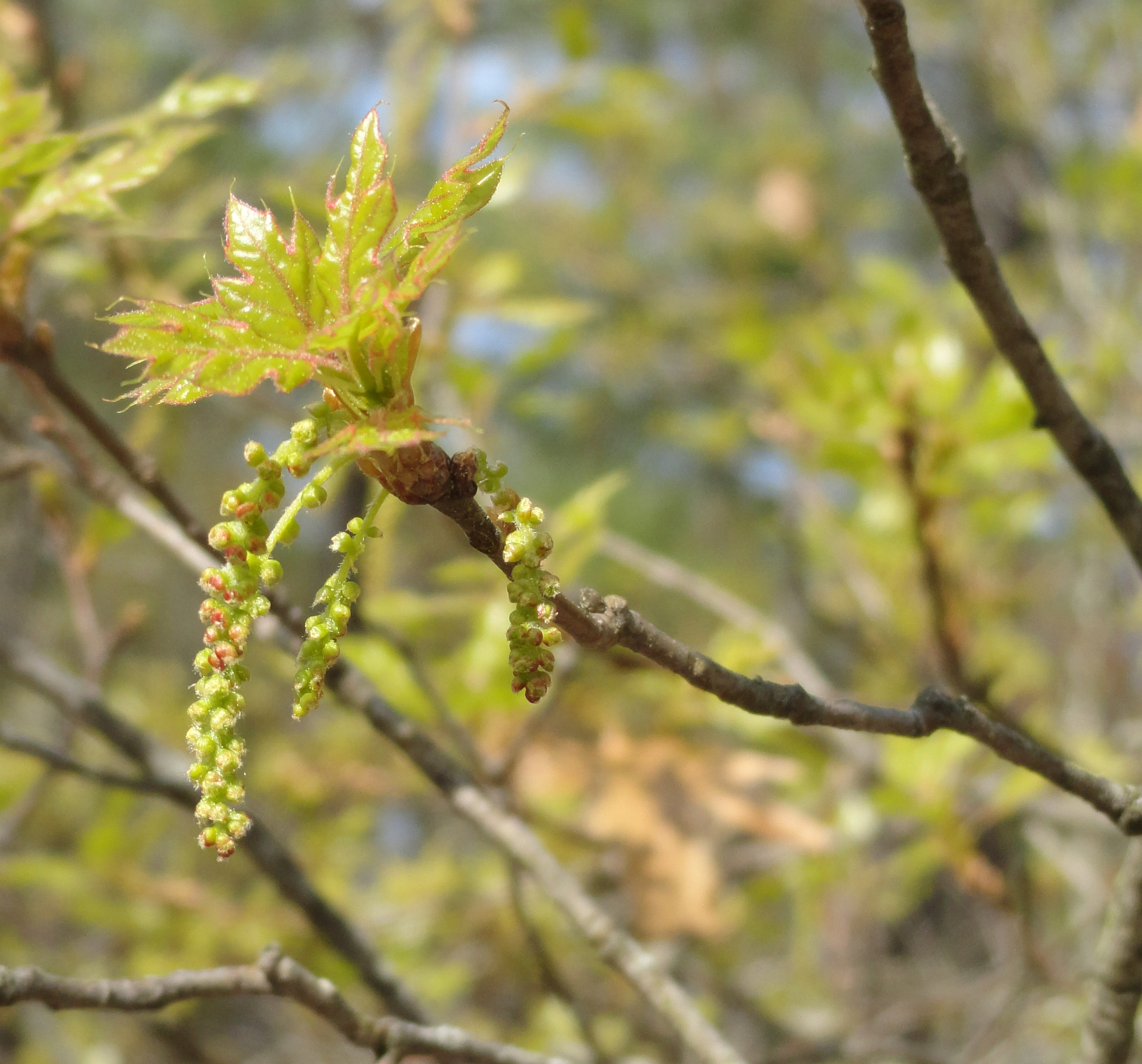
Catkins on a Georgia oak

The acorns are round, 9–14 millimeters (3/8–1/2 inch) long, maturing about 18 months after pollination.

=== Twigs and buds ===
Twigs are deep red, 1–2 mm in diameter and glabrous. Terminal buds are red-brown, ovoid to subconic, 2.5–5 mm, and glabrous or with scales somewhat ciliate.

=== Bark ===
The bark is gray to light brown, scaly.

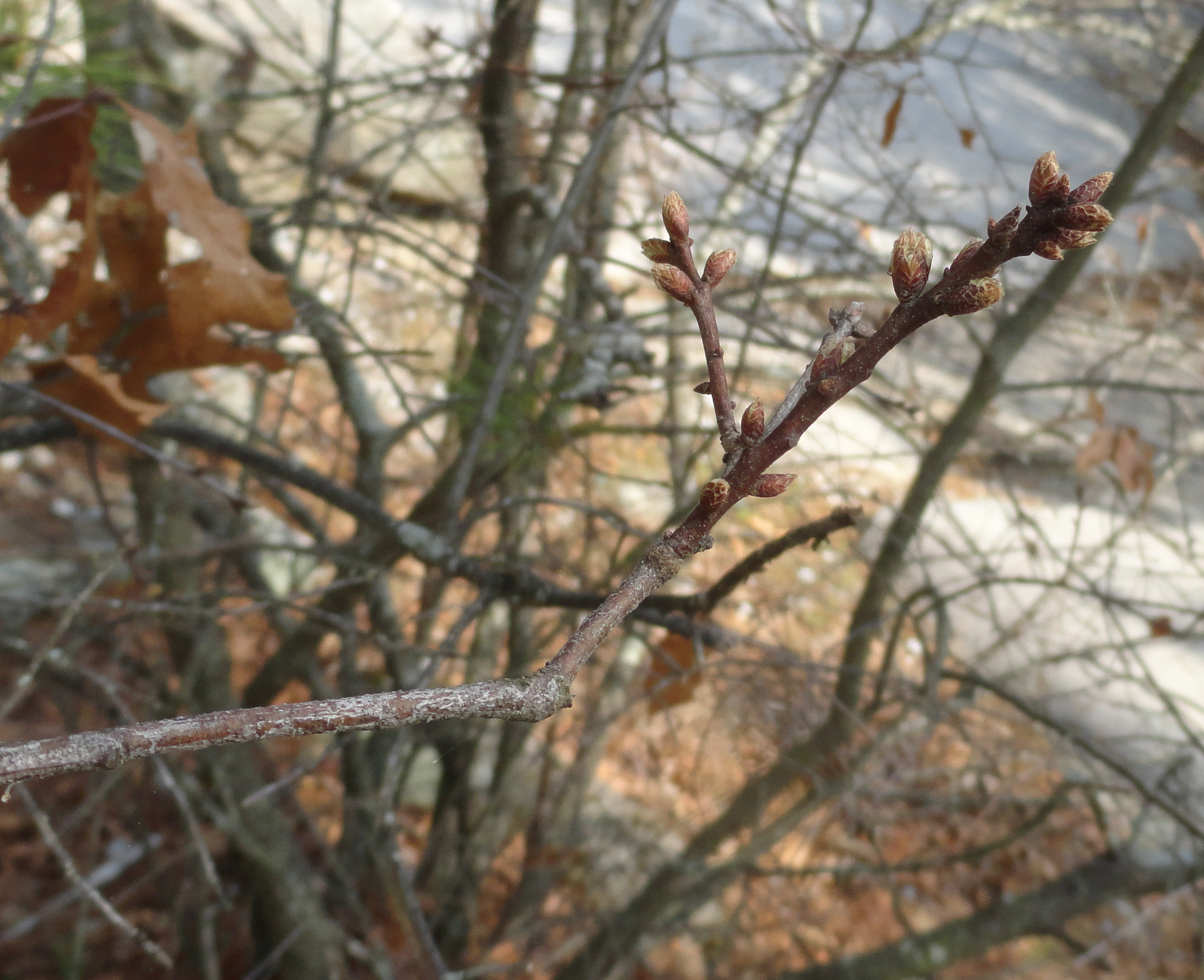
Georgia oak twig and buds

== Distribution and habitat ==
The Georgia oak is native to the southeastern United States, mainly in northern Georgia, but with additional populations in Alabama, North Carolina, and South Carolina. It grows on dry granite and sandstone outcrops of slopes of hills at 50–500 m (160–1,640 ft) altitude.

The tree was first discovered in 1849 at Stone Mountain, Georgia, where several stands of pure specimens grow along the popular walk-up trail at around 400 m (1,300 ft), near the large chestnut oak in the middle of the trail and before the rest pavilion halfway up the trail. Georgia oaks are also found at nearby monadnocks, including Panola Mountain and Arabia Mountain in Georgia.

== Uses ==
It is occasionally cultivated as a specimen or garden tree in USDA plant hardiness zones 5–8. Besides landscape horticulture, the Georgia oak has no commercial uses.
