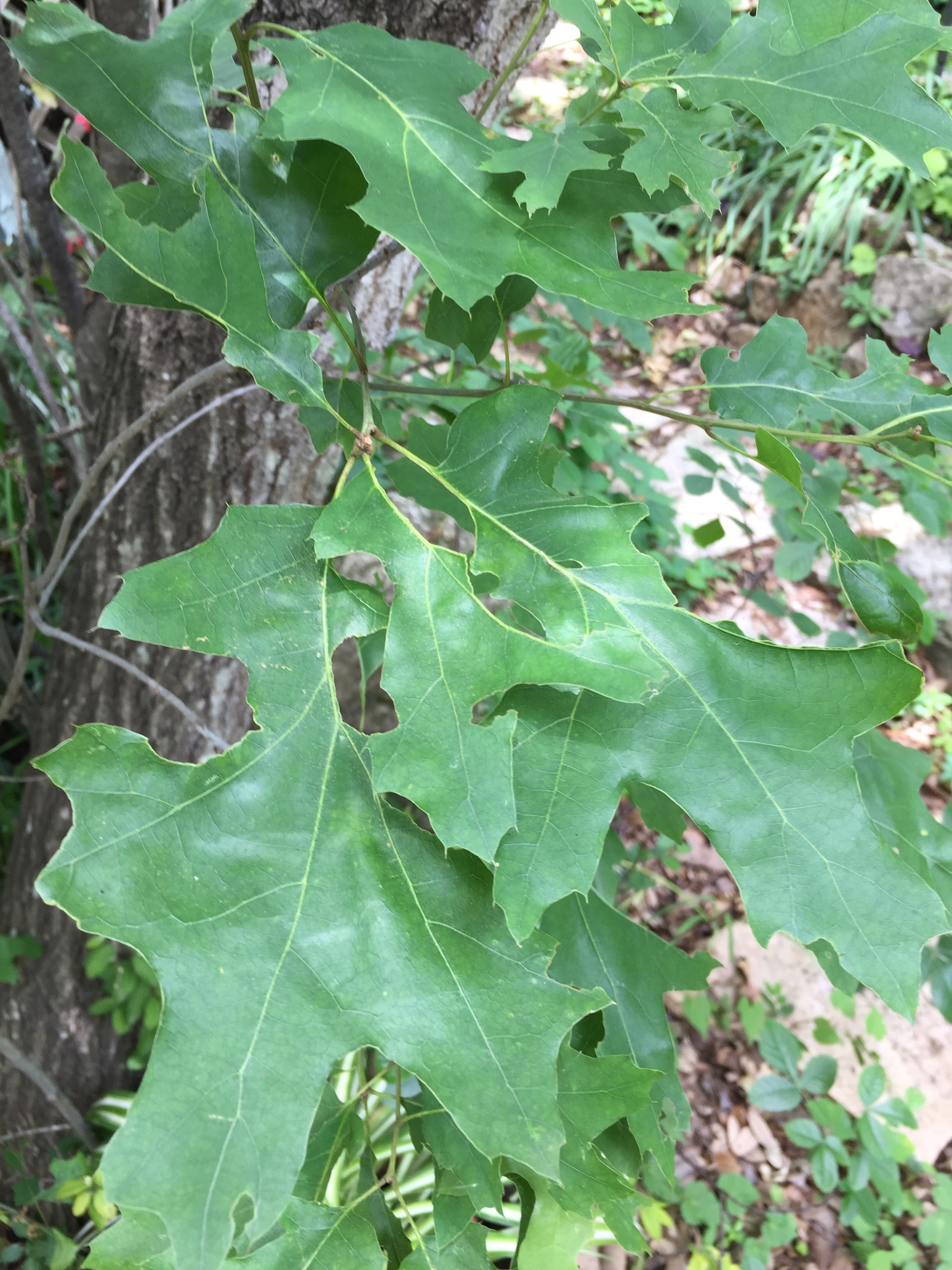

Conservation status
- Least Concern (IUCN 3.1)

Scientific classification
- Kingdom: Plantae
- Clade: Embryophytes
- Clade: Tracheophytes
- Clade: Spermatophytes
- Clade: Angiosperms
- Clade: Eudicots
- Clade: Rosids
- Order: Fagales
- Family: Fagaceae
- Genus: Quercus
- Subgenus: Quercus subg. Quercus
- Section: Quercus sect. Lobatae
- Species: Q. buckleyi

Binomial name
- Quercus buckleyi Nixon & Dorr

Synonyms
- Quercus texana Young; Quercus rubra var. texana Engelm.

= Quercus buckleyi =

Species of oak tree

Quercus buckleyi, commonly known as Texas red oak, Buckley's oak, or Spanish oak is a species of flowering plant. It is endemic to the southern Great Plains of the United States (Oklahoma and Texas).

Buckley's oak is smaller and more likely to be multitrunked than its close relative, the Shumard oak (Q. shumardii). The two species are interfertile, and hybrids are common along a line from Dallas to San Antonio, Texas. Texas red oak usually is 30 to 50 feet (9.1 to 15.2 meters) tall at maturity, and seldom reaches a height of more than 75 feet (23 meters).

Quercus buckleyi was formerly known as Q. texana, but under botanical rules of priority, that name properly refers to Nuttall's oak. This has led to much confusion.

It is a highly regarded ornamental and shade tree. In autumn, the leaves turn vivid red and orange.
