= List of Ku Klux Klan organizations =

Since the late 1860s, there have been many organizations that have used the title "Ku Klux Klan" or have split off from KKK groups using different names.

== Reconstruction Era paramilitaries ==
During Reconstruction, there were a number of white supremacist paramilitary groups that were organized in order to resist the reconstruction measures. While the Ku Klux Klan was the most famous group, it overlapped in membership and ideology with a number of others. In some cases, they were virtually indistinguishable from each other.

- Knights of the White Camelia
- Ku Klux Klan
- White League

== 1877–1914 ==
Between the Reconstruction period, known as the Klan's "first era", and the rebirth of the modern movement in 1915, there were a handful of groups that scholars have identified as "bridges" that engaged in similar vigilante activities and introduced Klan-type organizing into areas that were untouched by Reconstruction. In some cases, small towns often had so-called "decency committees" or "vigilance committees", which often used vigilante tactics against targets such as criminals, prostitutes, drunkards, and in some instances, Black people, Native Americans, Mexicans, Chinese Americans, European immigrants, Catholics, Mormons, and non-Christians, including Jews and atheists. Sometimes, in fact, their attire or their disguises resembled those which were worn by the KKK.

- Red Shirts (United States)

== 1915–1944 ==
During the "second era", the KKK movement saw the rise and decline of one of the largest and most influential Klan factions, the Knights of the Ku Klux Klan Inc. There were a few splinter groups, though, such as the Knights of the Flaming Sword, founded by ousted Imperial Wizard William J. Simmons and the Independent Klan of America, founded by Indiana Grand Dragon D. C. Stephenson. The 1930s saw the growth of fascist-leaning groups such as the Black Legion and a revived Knights of the White Camellia. It was also during this time period, that, for the first time ever, some KKK groups began to openly establish working relationships with pro-Nazi and pro-fascist groups, such as the German-American Bund and the Silver Shirts. The KKK also openly worked alongside the Anti-Saloon League, in order to achieve their shared goal of enforcing prohibition.

- Knights of the KKK
- Knights of the White Camelia

== 1944–1954 ==
In the period roughly between the end of World War II and the passage of the Supreme Court's so-called "Black Monday" ruling in Brown v. Board of Education, a number of small local "associations of Klans" were active, mainly in the Southeastern states.

- Association of Georgia Klans

== 1954–1969 ==
During the period of the civil rights movement in the late 1950s and 1960s, the Klan experienced its "third era" which saw the growth of a number of KKK groups that sought to resist desegregation, by peaceful as well as violent means. However, desegregation was not their only target, other targets of the Klan's protests and hatred included the 1960s counterculture, labor unions, divorce, the theory of Evolution, liberalism, and so-called Jewish Bolshevism. It was also during this time that many Klan groups began to work with other white supremacist groups like the White Citizens' Council, the American Nazi Party and the National States' Rights Party.

- National Knights of the Ku Klux Klan
- Original Ku Klux Klan of the Confederacy
- Silver Dollar Group
- U.S. Klans
- United Klans of America
- White Knights of the Ku Klux Klan

== 1970s–present ==
Since the 1970s, the Klan's popularity, both among racists and the general public, has been in consistent decline. Just between 2016 and 2019 the number of self-identified Klan groups dropped from 130 to 51. While this may be partially influenced by popular public opinion against the Klan's views, it may also be influenced by the Klan's perceived modern lack of relevance among Americans whose politics tilt toward racist ideologies. Many factions of the Klan began to form alliances with neo-Nazi groups, some members of the American militia movement, and other right-wing extremists, with the goal of cross-recruitment.

- Carolina Knights of the Ku Klux Klan
- Church of the Ku Klux Klan
- Old Glory Knights of the Ku Klux Klan
- Church of the National Knights of the Ku Klux Klan
- East Coast Knights of the True Invisible Empire
- Exalted Knights of the Ku Klux Klan
- Traditionalist American Knights of the Ku Klux Klan/TAKKKK
- Honorable Sacred Knights of the Ku Klux Klan
- Imperial Klans of America
- International Keystone Knights of the Ku Klux Klan
- Knights of the Ku Klux Klan
- Loyal White Knights of the Ku Klux Klan
- Noble Klans of America
- Nordic Order Knights of the Ku Klux Klan
- Order of the Ku Klux Klan / White Christian Brotherhood
- Patriotic Brigade Knights of the Ku Klux Klan
- Rebel Brigade Knights True Invisible Empire
- Trinity White Knights of the Ku Klux Klan
- United Klan Nation
- United Klans of America
- United Northern and Southern Knights of the Ku Klux Klan
- American Patriot Knights Of The Ku Klux Klan
- Adirondack Fraternal White Knights

== Outside the United States ==
Since the foundation of the original Klan, a number of Ku Klux Klan groups and chapters have emerged outside the United States in places like Canada, Europe and South America.

- Germany had a small group named the "Order of the Knights of the Fiery Cross" which operated in the mid-1920s.
- Fiji had a Ku Klux Klan group, which was founded by Europeans, and the group was said to be the Klan's first foreign chapter. However, the group's activities were quickly halted by the British colonials after they discovered that the Fijian Klan planned to rebel against the crown.
- There was a post-WWII Ku Klux Klan group in Chile which was headed by Franz Schweitzer. It received significant notoriety in the late 1950s when four of its members attempted to bomb a synagogue in Santiago. Threatening letters were also sent to Jews, demanding that they send funds to Horace Sherman, a member of the American Ku Klux Klan who resided in Waco, Texas.
- European White Knights of the Ku Klux Klan - Founded on October 1 of the year 2000, this short lived Klan group was based in the German state of Baden-Württemberg. The organization is believed to have dissolved itself in late 2002.
- European White Knights of the Burning Cross - A European offshoot of the Klan that is said to be active in Germany, England, Sweden, France, Austria, Switzerland and Italy.
- Imperial Klans of America, Brazil - The Brazilian chapter of the Imperial Klans of America. This group gained media attention in 2015 after propaganda stickers which were produced by it surfaced in Niterói. The stickers contained messages which threatened Muslims and homosexuals.
- Imperial Klans of Brazil - An earlier Brazilian chapter of the Imperial Klans of America that was shut down after its leader was arrested in 2003.
- Knights of the Ku Klux Klan of Kanada - A Canadian Ku Klux Klan organization that was based in Toronto.
- Ku Klux Klan – Distrikt Nordrhein-Westfalen - A German Ku Klux Klan group operating in North Rhine-Westphalia.
- Ku Klux Klan of Kanada - One of the most prominent KKK groups in Canada during the mid-1920s.
- Ku Klux Klan in Mecklenburg-Vorpommern - An active German Ku Klux Klan group that operates in the state of Mecklenburg-Vorpommern.
- National Socialist Knights of the Ku Klux Klan Deutschland - A German KKK group that mixes elements of Nazism with the ideologies of the American Klan.
- Order of the Knights of the Fiery Cross - A KKK-related group which was founded in Germany in the 1920s. The group disbanded after the Nazification of Germany occurred, prompting its members to join the Nazis.
- European Empire White Knights (EEWK) – founded on December 1, 2015, based in France and present in several European countries.

== See also ==
- African-American history
- Anti-Asian racism#United States
- Anti-Catholicism#United States
- Anti-Catholicism in the United States
- Antisemitism by country#United States
- Antisemitism in the United States
- History of antisemitism#United States
- History of antisemitism in the United States
- Culture of the Southern United States
- Discrimination based on skin tone#United States
- Discrimination in the United States#Racism
- Far-right politics#United States
- Far-right subcultures#United States
- Fascism in North America#United States
- Fascism in the United States
- Hate crime laws in the United States
- History of the Ku Klux Klan in New Jersey
- History of the Southern United States
- Indiana Klan
- Identity politics
- Ku Klux Klan in Canada
- Ku Klux Klan in Inglewood, California
- Ku Klux Klan in Maine
- Ku Klux Klan members in United States politics
- Ku Klux Klan raid (Inglewood)
- Ku Klux Klan recruitment
- Ku Klux Klan regalia and insignia
- Ku Klux Klan titles and vocabulary
- Leaders of the Ku Klux Klan
- List of fascist movements
- List of fascist movements by country
- List of neo-Nazi organizations
- List of organizations designated by the SPLC as hate groups
- List of white nationalist organizations
- Lost Cause of the Confederacy
- Lynching#United States
- Lynching in the United States
- Mass racial violence in the United States
- Nadir of American race relations
- Nativism (politics)#United States
- Nativism in United States politics
- Nazism in the Americas
- Neo-Confederates
- Political violence in the United States
- Politics of the Southern United States
- Racism against African Americans
- Racism against Native Americans in the United States
- Racism in the United States
- Radical right (Europe)
- Radicalism in the United States
- Radical right (United States)
- Reconstruction era
- Religious discrimination in the United States
- Secession in the United States
- Terrorism in the United States
- Domestic terrorism in the United States
- Timeline of terrorist attacks in the United States
- White backlash#United States
- White nationalism#United States
- White nationalism in the United States
- White supremacy#United States
- White supremacy in the United States
- Xenophobia#United States
- Xenophobia in the United States
- Old Glory Knights of the Ku Klux Klan
