= U.S. Klans =

Ku Klux Klan organization

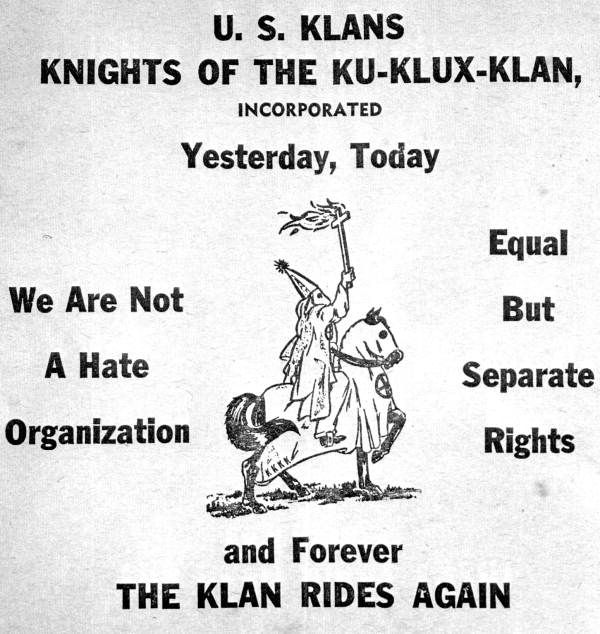
Flier advertising the U.S. Klans.

The U.S. Klans, officially, the U.S. Klans, Knights of the Ku Klux Klan, Inc. was the dominant Ku Klux Klan in the late 1950s and early 1960s. The death of its leader in 1960, along with increased factionalism, splits and competition from other groups led to its decline by the mid-to-late 1960s.

== Origins ==
The group was first organized in Atlanta, Georgia in September 1953 as the U.S. Klans of Georgia by Eldon Edwards. Initial membership was drawn from the remnants of Dr. Samuel Green's old Association of Georgia Klans. More members came to the group after the Supreme Court's so-called "Black Monday" decision mandating school desegregation. On October 24, 1955, the national group was chartered, with Samuel Green, Jr. as attorney and William Daniel and M. Wesley Morgan as incorporating officers. Edwards revised and copyrighted a new version of William Joseph Simmons's Kloran and claimed this as a "direct link" to the Klan of the 1920s. By 1959 the organization was at its peak with 15,000 members in nine or ten states, with the greatest concentration of members in Georgia, South Carolina, Alabama and Louisiana. A recruiting drive in March 1961 featured simultaneous cross burnings throughout the South. In 1955 the clans stone mountain site gained the support of Governor Marvin Griffin. On September 29, 1956, the US Klans staged the largest KKK rally since World War II when it gathered nearly 3,000 people at Stone Mountain, Georgia. The crowd reportedly came in over 1,000 cars decked out in Klan insignia and bearing license plates from Georgia, South Carolina, Alabama, Louisiana, Virginia and Tennessee.

== Factionalization ==
Nevertheless, the group still suffered from factional problems. In late 1956, the Rev. James W. "Catfish" Cole defected to form his own North Carolina Knights of the Ku Klux Klan which made headlines during its confrontation with Lumbee Indians in January 1958. In 1957 Edwards banished Texas kleagle Horace Sherman Miller for failing to establish a single klavern in his two years in office, and using his kleagle monies for private purposes. Miller responding by establishing his own Aryan Knights of the Ku Klux Klan, which did not have much formal membership, but gained notoriety by its contacts with like minded groups all around the world. Another group of Klansmen were expelled from the Chattanooga Klavern #1 in the summer of 1957 for unspecified reasons. This group reconstituted itself as the Dixie Klans, Knights of the Ku Klux Klan, Inc. in October of that year and would expand into Alabama and northwestern Georgia in the following years.

More serious issues were coming to ahead in Alabama. That realm had been led by one of the US Klans most effective organizers, Grand Dragon Rev. Alvin Horn. Under Horn's leadership the realm had expanded from two klaverns in the summer of 1956 to 100 by early 1957. However, when Horn's wife became despondent over a recent surgery she committed suicide, leaving him to care for their six children by himself. Horn then married a 15-year-old girl whom he had gotten pregnant. The scandal forced Horn to step down as Grand Dragon and he was replaced by Robert Shelton. Shelton quickly became disenchanted with Edwards' leadership and split to form his own Alabama Knights of the Ku Klux Klan, which became a competitor with the US Klans in Alabama and started to outgrow it.

On August 1, 1960, Imperial Wizard Edwards died of a heart attack, at age fifty one. A bitter power struggle then ensued between Edwards' widow, who wanted Rev. E.E. George to be the new Imperial Wizard and the faction around Georgia Grand Dragon Robert "Wild Bill" Davidson who was chosen by the membership as the new leader. Initially, Imperial Wizard Davidson struck a moderate tone, stating that he wanted to bring the Klan "out of the darkness and make it a progressive movement, not just a protest movement." He distanced the organization from people like George Lincoln Rockwell, Robert Shelton, Asa Carter and the National States' Rights Party. He told the press "I don't get myself connected with any fanatical movement". By November he was taking a more militant stand, stating that, if necessary, Klansmen would use buckshot to prevent integration. Davidson's reign as Imperial Wizard proved short-lived. Facing harassment and lawsuits by Mrs. Edwards and E.E. George, Davidson resigned on February 18, 1961, founding his own group, Invisible Empire, United Klans, Knights of the Ku Klux Klan of America, Inc. He was joined by Georgia Grand Dragon Calvin Craig and klaverns in Georgia and Alabama. Davidson's commitment to non-violence and condemnation of the violence during the integration of the University of Georgia in Athens, Georgia, in which Calvin Craig was personally involved, led to his second resignation as Imperial Wizard on April 1, and he was succeeded by Craig. The Invisible Empire, United Klans, Knights of the Ku Klux Klan of America, Inc merged with Shelton's Alabama Knights on July 8 to form the United Klans of America, which became the dominant Klan of the 1960s

== Freedom Rides and decline ==
During 1961 the US Klans, along with several other groups, attempted to resist the freedom rides which were attempting to test integration of Interstate transportation. On May 14, in conjunction with the Alabama Knights, they stopped and boarded a bus in Anniston, beat several of the passengers and drove it to Birmingham, where they drove the passengers out of the bus and into the hands of an angry mob. On May 20 they attacked another bus as it arrived in Montgomery. A federal temporary restraining order was issued against the US Klans (and against Alvin Horn, who had been reappointed Grand Dragon of Alabama by Davidson) by the United States District Court for the Middle District of Alabama on May 20 and a preliminary injunction on June 2, enjoining, them from interfering with interstate commerce, committing acts of violence or intimidation against the freedom riders.

E.E. George remained imperial wizard until October 26, 1963, when the College Park Klavern #297 engineered a special klonvocation to oust George on charges of financial irregularity and install their Exalted Cyclops, H. J. Jones, as leader. The victory proved hollow as all other active klaverns in the group followed George into yet another faction, the Improved Order of the U.S. Klans. By January 1967 the US Klans numbered less than fifty members and was still declining. It disappeared entirely by the end of the decade.

While the US Klans proceeded with the single klavern in College Park, the Improved Order maintained a presence in Lithonia, Georgia, its headquarters, as well as klaverns in Tallapoosa, Georgia, two in Union Springs, Alabama, one in Heiberger, Alabama and one in Florida. By January 1967 it was estimated to have about 100 members.

In October 1965 the US Klans, the Improved Order and the Dixie Klans were all identified as being members of James Venable's National Association of the Ku Klux Klan, a federation of semi-autonomous groups. All of these factions were defunct by the early 1970s.

== Publications ==
- The principles of the U.S. Klans, Knights of the Ku Klux Klan, Inc. College Park, Ga.
- The Georgia Klansman Macon, Ga. : U.S. Klans-Knights of the Ku-Klux-Klan, 1959-?
