= National Knights of the Ku Klux Klan =

Ku Klux Klan organization

The National Knights of the Ku Klux Klan is a Klan faction that has been in existence since November 1963. In the sixties, the National Knights were the main competitors against Robert Shelton's United Klans of America.

The National Knights were founded by James R. Venable, a second generation Klansman whose family owned the property on Stone Mountain where the Second Era Ku Klux Klan was founded. Venable had been a member of a succession of Klans since 1927 by the late 1950s, when he had risen to the rank of Imperial Klonsel of the U.S. Klans. When that group began to be rent with factionalism in 1960, Venable joined the new United Klans of America, holding the Imperial Klonsel position there, as well as in the US Klans. On April 11, 1962, Venable founded the Defensive Legion of Registered Americans. July fourth of that year saw a joint rally of this organization with the UKA and the National White Americans Party at Stone Mountain. Originally charted for 35 years, the organization seems to have lapsed sometime in 1964. Venable teamed up with Wally Butterworth to create a series of radio programs and phonograph records under the Defensive Legion label, as well as under the name Christian Voters and Buyers League. The radio program was eventually taken off the Atlanta radio station WJUN, but the records remained popular in white supremacist circles and were used as Klan recruitment tools. One of the issues that the phonograph records tried to popularize was the so-called kosher tax. Venable put up the money for the creation of these records himself, and even though some income was derived therefrom, the operation was a financial loss.

Venable charted the National Knights of the Ku Klux Klan, Inc. with the Secretary of State of Georgia on Nov. 1, 1963. The other incorporators were Wally Butterworth, also of Stone Mountain, Georgia, William Hugh Morris of Buchanan, Georgia and H.G.Hill of Atlanta.

In 1964 the National Knights began to organize in Ohio, incorporating a realm on Oct. 25, 1964. Klaverns were established in Columbia, Cincinnati and Oregonia This was the first Klan presence in the state since 1944. However, dissension arose and Grand Dragon Harvey Flynn was ousted in May 1964, going on to become Grand Dragon of a competing UKA realm. Later, after the National Knights state charter was revoked, a new Knights of the Ku Klux Klan, Inc. was founded in the state, led by veteran Alabama Klansmen Emperor William Morris Hughes, which may have acted as a front for the National Knights.

== National Association of Ku Klux Klans ==
According to Venables testimony before the House Un-American Activities Committee, the "National Association" or "Federation" of Ku Klux Klans existed basically as an informal meeting of KKK groups that began in either 1957 or 1958 while he was a member of the US Klans. In the early years the chairmanship of the Association would alternate, with a Klansmen from the host state elected as chairmen. In 1963, Venable stated he had been elected "temporary chairman" for three one-year terms. In Sept. of 1964 the National Association held an election. Aside from Venable, who was reelected chairman, the following officers were elected: P.L. Morgan of the Original Knights of the Ku Klux Klan klaliff (vice-president); I.T. "Ted" Shearouse of the Association of Georgia Klans was elected kligrapp (secretary); Charles Maddox, also of the AGK, as klokard, H.G. Hill as Kludd (chaplain); Walter Rogers of the United Florida Ku Klux Klan as kladd; Flynn Harvey, of the Ohio Realm of the National Knights, klexter; Robert Hodges of the Association of South Carolina Klans as nighthawk; subsequent to the meeting, Murray H. Martin, of the Original Knights was elected head of the klokann. In his HUAC testimony Venable affirmed that each of these was a delegate from their respective Klans at the meeting, but could not confirm their positions as officers, other than himself and Shearouse (though he did not say what group Morgan and Martin belonged to).

Of the member groups, Venable gave ambiguous answers as to whether the Original Knights were a membership organization. Venable described "membership" in the Association as the presence of delegates to one of the meetings, noting that not every group attended every meeting or sent the same delegates. Among the groups named as sending delegates to meetings were the Association of South Carolina Klans, Association of Georgia Klans, the US Klans, the Improved Order of the US Klans, the Dixie Klans ("several times...when it used to rotate over the various states"), the United Florida Ku Klux Klan (though Venable denied knowing the exact name of the Florida affiliate). Venable also claimed not to possess any paperwork for the Association, other than its constitution. Contradictory evidence is available regarding the membership of the Association of Arkansas Klans. Venable mentions an Arkansas group belonging to the Association, but does not elaborate (the index indicates that the Association of Arkansas Klans is being referenced there). Elsewhere it is stated that the AAK was independent, and it doesn't appear on the National Associations organization chart. Other sources state that the Arkansas group was part of the Association. Sources also vary regarding the Federated Ku Klux Klan, Inc. head by William Hugh Morris. The Anti-Defamation League stated that it was a member of the Association.
