= Camp Nordland =

Resort in Andover, New Jersey

Coordinates: 41.02985°N 74.72035°W

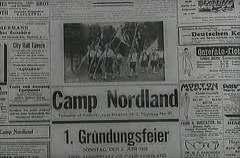
Camp Nordland in a Bund publication

Camp Nordland was a 204-acre (83 ha) resort facility located in Andover Township, New Jersey. From 1937 to 1941, this site was owned and operated by the German American Bund, which sympathized with and propagandized for Nazi Germany in the United States. This resort camp was opened by the Bund on 18 July 1937.

== History ==
In the years before the Second World War, the Bund held events at the facility to encourage pro-German, pro-Nazi values—many of these events attracting over 10,000 visitors. In its first year, about 8,000 people gathered at the site to enjoy refreshments as they practiced speech making, Nazi salutes and marches. Newspaper articles report that protests were established by Samuel Dickstein, American Legion, and various VFW posts throughout the state.

On 18 August 1940, it was the site of a joint rally with the Ku Klux Klan, organized by Alton Milford Young and Arthur Hornbui Bell. The rally was greeted unenthusiastically by many members of the Klan, many of whom were nationalists who viewed the Bund as against American interests. The rally had anticipated 50,000 attendees, but less than 3,000 people were present. Both Young and Bell were later ousted from their positions by the Klan for the meeting. On 30 April 1941, Sussex County sheriff Denton Quick (d. 1969) led a law-enforcement raid with ten deputized American Legionnaires on the camp which resulted in its closure, confiscation, and the arrests and trials of key Bund leaders. One of those convicted, August Klapprott, a naturalized American citizen, later petitioned the Supreme Court of the United States in Klapprott v. United States, 335 U.S. 601 (1949), to intervene in the revocation of his citizenship and the proposed deportation that resulted from his conviction.

After being seized by the government, the property was eventually turned over to Andover Township and became the township's "Hillside Park." Today, the facility houses the township's police headquarters and several recreational fields. The property's banquet hall is used for township events and frequently rented for wedding receptions. While much of its history and notoriety has faded over the last 70 years, many local residents of Sussex County still refer to the area as the "bund camp."

== See also ==
- Ku Klux Klan in New Jersey
- Camp Siegfried
- Pillar of Fire Church in Zarephath, New Jersey where Ku Klux Klan rallies were held
- Nazism in the United States
