= Association of Georgia Klans =

Ku Klux Klan organization

The Association of Georgia Klans, also known as the Associated Klans of Georgia, was a Klan faction organized by Samuel Green in 1944, and led by him until his death in 1949. At its height the organization had klaverns in each of Georgia's 159 counties, as well as klaverns in Alabama, Tennessee, South Carolina and Florida. It also had connections with klaverns and kleagles in Ohio and Indiana. After Green's death, however, the organization foundered as it split into different factions, was hit with a tax lien and was beset by adverse publicity. It was moribund by the time of the Supreme Court's "Black Monday" ruling in 1954. A second Association of Georgia Klans was formed when Charles Maddox led dissatisfied members out of the U.S. Klans in 1960. This group appears to have folded into James Venable's National Knights of the Ku Klux Klan by 1965. There is also a current Klan group by that name.

== History ==
=== Prelude ===
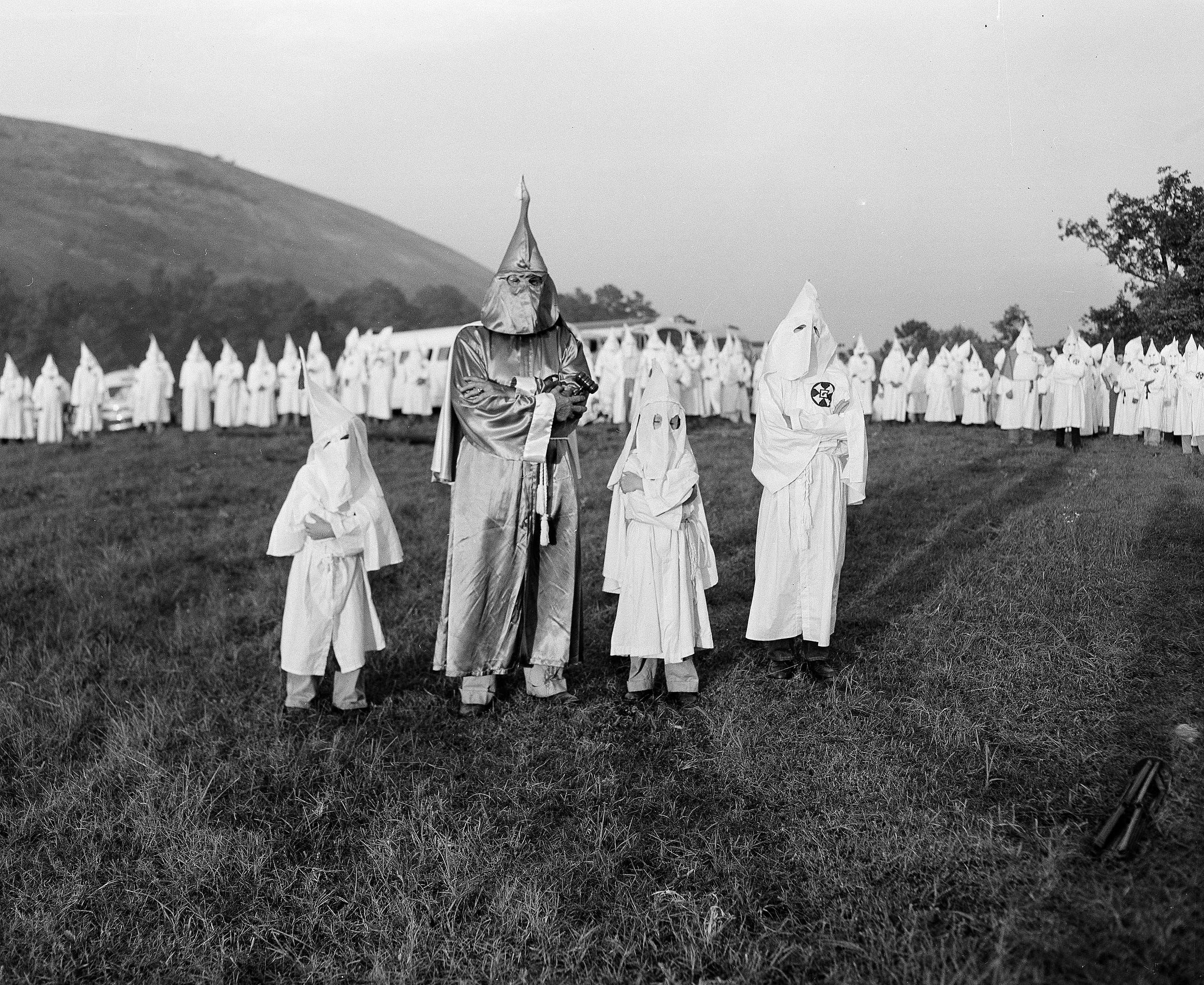
Two children wearing Ku Klux Klan robes and hoods stand on either side of Samuel Green, Ku Klux Klan Grand Dragon, at an initiation ceremony in Atlanta. July 24, 1948.

The Association was formed at the same klonvokation that dissolved the Second Era Knights of the Ku Klux Klan. The new group was to be an "informal, unincorporated" alliance of klaverns which would remain active in the state of Georgia. Green was elected to the post of Grand Dragon, the usual designation of a state leader of the KKK. Initially there were only twelve klaverns in the Association. In October 1945 the group conducted the first cross burning since the end of World War II atop Stone Mountain. At the time Green told the press that cross burning had been suspended during wartime because "all factions had to unite to win the war". At the time of the cross burning the Association claimed 20,000 members. On March 21 the Klans attorney, Morgan Telser, filed a corporate registration with the Georgia Secretary of State for the "Knights of the Ku Klux Klan, Inc" and paid up the dues for the period 1943–6. On May 9, 1946, Green held the first large scale initiation ceremony on Stone Mountain. Approximately 1,000 on-lookers watched as 227 aliens were naturalized by 1,000 robed Klansmen under the light of five burning crosses. Green triumphantly announced "We are revived." The initiates included a bus load of visitors from Tennessee. The presence of women among the assembled Klan members was also noted. Some altercations broke out with journalists, as the AGK had granted Look exclusive rights to take pictures.

=== Legal problems ===
These demonstrations were met with hostility from labor and political groups. On May 30 the Internal Revenue Service filed suit against the Association on the basis that they were a continuation of the former "Knights of the Ku Klux Klan, Inc." and thus owed the government the $685,305 in back taxes owed by the former organization. Green countered that his association was not organically linked to the Knights, though there was a five-man board of directors who were tasked with "keeping the charter alive" and could "reactivate" the national klan at the appropriate time. Pending that, he led a group of klaverns informally "associated" with each other to perpetuate the beliefs and activities of the parent organization.

The Klan also faced opposition from Gov. Ellis Arnall. The governor instructed Attorney General Eugene Cook to institute quo warranto proceedings against the group to revoke its charter. Among the reasons for the revocation of the charter, the governors order listed: that the Klan operated as a for-profit group, despite its non-profit charter, and as such owed federal back taxes; that it was political, despite being described as non-political in its charter; the Klan engaged in violent and unlawful activities; and despite its "fraternal" appellation, it existed to foster hate, prejudice and intolerance. As for the Association of Georgia Klans being different from the Knights of the Ku Klux Klan, Dan Duke, an assistant attorney general heading the investigation, stated that the Association was the "ragtag and bobtail of the old order and their claiming to be different will not interfere with the legal procedure contemplated in any way". The quo warranto petition was presented to Judge Frank A. Hooper of Fulton County Superior Court on June 20. The petition alleged that the Association was, in effect, a for-profit organization that existed to enrich its officers. The petition further stated that the Association used the same Kloran, titles, passwords, grips and signs of the Knights of the Ku Klux Klan, Inc. and the seven klaverns in the Atlanta area were charted by the Knights of the Ku Klux Klan, Inc.

While the process to revoke the charter was going on the Georgia Bureau of Investigation and the Federal Bureau of Investigation announced that they had found evidence of specific violent acts, either claimed or contemplated by AGK members. A GBI infiltrater (Stetson Kennedy) announced that he had overheard members of the Klavalier Klub, a Klan wrecking crew, taking credit for the death of a black taxi driver the previous August and the flogging of another African American. The authorities linked this to the death of taxi driver Porter Flornoy Turner in August 1945, and the kidnapping and beating of black Navy veteran Hugh Johnson, who had been given 52 lashes on Feb. 13, 1946. There was also an alleged conspiracy to assassinate or "take care of" Gov. Arnell.

The legal manoeuvrings over the charter dragged on through the late summer and fall. Duke made trips to confer with New Jersey officials to clarify the Klans links with the German American Bund, and continuing links with fascists. In September, the Klan backed Eugene Talmage, who won the Democratic primary. Talmage promised to drop the suit once he became governor in January. The dateline for the suit to come to court was delayed throughout November and into December. It was finally scheduled for December 13. As the state courts were to adjourn on December 15, it was thought that the suit would never go to trial, as Talmage would soon be inaugurated.

On December 21 Eugene Talmage died. There was no clear successor to the governor-elect, and the state's executive was thrown into chaos among competing claims to the governorship. Talmadge was buried on the 23rd. The Klan sent a "huge" floral wreath with a white ribbon with four golden Ks emblazoned on it. After a drawn-out crisis to determine who the next governor would be, Melvin E. Thompson was inaugurated on March 20, 1947. He pledged to continue the suit against the Klan.

In June 1947, the Klan finally decided to surrender its Georgia state charter after the state dropped the charges of murder, flogging, false arrest and breach of the peace. Attorney General Eugene Cook stated that it would be too difficult to prove the individual acts of violence were attributable to the organization. This prevented the AGK from suing to protect its name, or have any other sanction of law, but did not dissolve the Association. On Nov. 4, 1947 Cook announced that files on the Klan which named "prominent individuals" were stolen from his office.

=== Voter intimidation ===
In the 1948 election the AGK used intimidation tactics to discourage black voters. In Wrightsville 300 robed klansmen paraded in the street before the Democratic primary and burned a 15 ft cross on the county courthouse lawn. Grand Dragon Green condemned President Harry S. Truman's civil rights policies and told the crowd "whenever the Negro takes a place at the side of a white man through the force of federal bayonets, blood will flow in the streets". None of the 241 qualified black voters voted in the next day's Democratic primary. In Swainsboro, Mount Vernon and Jeffersonville cross burnings, threatening letters and the distribution of coffins marked "KKK" convinced black voters to stay at home. Green was rewarded by being appointed a lieutenant colonel and aide-de-camp of the Governor.

== Relationships with other groups ==
Despite sharing the antisemitic and anti-black beliefs of the Neo-Nazi Columbians, Inc., also based in Atlanta, the two groups did not necessarily get along. One of the reasons Klan attorney Morgan Belser gave for the AGKs attempt to reactivate its charter was to squelch attempts by the Columbians or other "radical groups" to appropriate the Klans name. When a Columbian attempted to assassinate journalist Stetson Kennedy in an Atlanta courtroom in 1947, it was a fellow Klansmen, Ira Jett, who knocked the would be attacker out of the way.

== Publications ==
- Ideals of the Ku Klux Klan. Assn. of Ga. Klans [Atlanta?]
