= North Avenue Presbyterian Church =

Historic church in Georgia, United States

- U.S. National Register of Historic Places
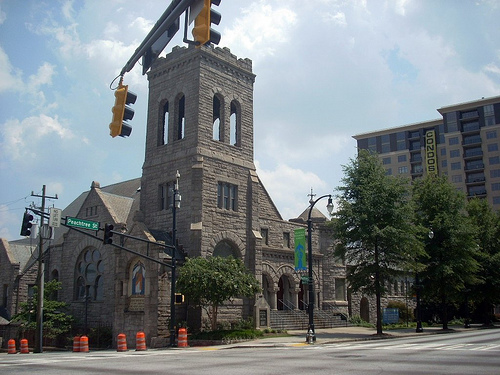
- North Avenue Presbyterian Church, 2009

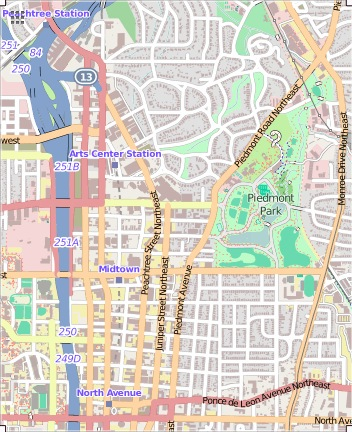
- Location within Atlanta Midtown Location within Atlanta Location within Georgia Location within the United States
- Location: 607 Peachtree Ave., NE, Atlanta, Georgia
- Coordinates: 33°46′16″N 84°23′4″W
- Area: 0.3 acres (0.12 ha)
- Built: 1900
- Architects: Bruce, Alexander Campbell; Morgan, Thomas Henry
- Architectural style: Romanesque
- Website: https://www.napc.org/history/
- NRHP reference No.: 78000984
- Added to NRHP: November 17, 1978

North Avenue Presbyterian Church is a historic Presbyterian church at 607 Peachtree Avenue, NE in Atlanta, Georgia. The church building was completed in 1900 and was added to the National Register of Historic Places in 1978.

== History ==
As the city grew to the north, several Presbyterians felt the need for a new church in the area. The first organizational meeting for the new church were held about 1894 by Mrs. Joseph M. High, Mrs. J. D. McCarty, and Mrs. Clem Harris, who were members of the First Presbyterian Church of Atlanta. The official founding was in December 1898 and included 100 members from First Presbyterian, 15 from Central Presbyterian Church, and one from Athens Presbyterian Church.

In 1909, the church created the North Avenue Presbyterian School, which by 1951 would become The Westminster Schools.

== Notable attendees ==
- Roy LeCraw, former mayor of Atlanta
- Tom Cousins, former owner of the Atlanta Hawks and Atlanta Flames, developer of the CNN Center and Omni Coliseum, founder of the East Lake Foundation
- Jane Woodruff, philanthropist, daughter of George W. Woodruff, Director of the Coca-Cola Company
- James R. Venable, who founded the National Knights of the Ku Klux Klan

== Bibliography ==
- Garrett, Franklin M. (1969). Atlanta and Environs: A Chronicle of Its People and Events, 1880s-1930s. Athens, Georgia: University of Georgia Press. ISBN 978-0-8203-3904-7 – via Google Books.

Blackshear Flinn, Elizabeth (January 1, 2001). With feet of clay: A history of the North Avenue Presbyterian Church, Atlanta, Georgia, 1898-2001. Klest Koncepts.
