= Homer Chase =

American Communist Party activist (1917–1985)

Homer Bates Chase
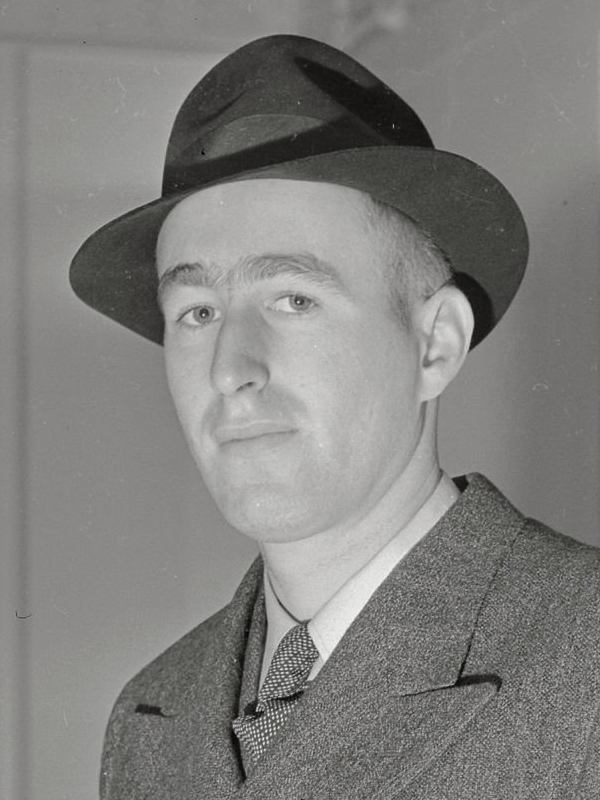
- Chase in 1938
- Born: January 29, 1917; Washington, New Hampshire, U.S.
- Died: August 29, 1985 (aged 68); Hingham, Massachusetts, U.S.
- Movement: Communism
- Children: 5

Homer Bates Chase (January 29, 1917 – August 29, 1985) was an activist in the American Communist Party. He was the head of the Communist Party of Georgia in the 1940s.

== Early life ==
Chase's ancestors first arrived in America in the 1600s. His parents, Fred B. and Elba Chase, were leaders in the American Communist Party in New Hampshire. He was born in Washington, New Hampshire. Chase fought for the Republicans in the Lincoln Battalion in the Spanish Civil War. He also fought in World War II.

== Communist activism ==
During the 1940s, Chase was the head of the Communist Party in Georgia. He participated in the early civil rights movement, campaigning for black people's right to vote. While in Georgia, Chase was arrested after threatening to harm a 20-year-old member of the Communist Party if he divulged information regarding the party's operations. Klansman James Venable defended him. In the late 1950s, he was a section organizer for the New England party branch. In the 1960s, Chase denounced President Kennedy's foreign policy as threatening world peace.

== Personal life ==
Chase had four daughters: Norah, Hannah Bates Cowen, Claudette Chase, and Rebecca Jo Kyle. He also had a son, Leonard Foster Chase.

== Death ==
Chase died in his sleep at his home in Hingham, Massachusetts, on August 29, 1985.
