= History of the Ku Klux Klan in New Jersey =

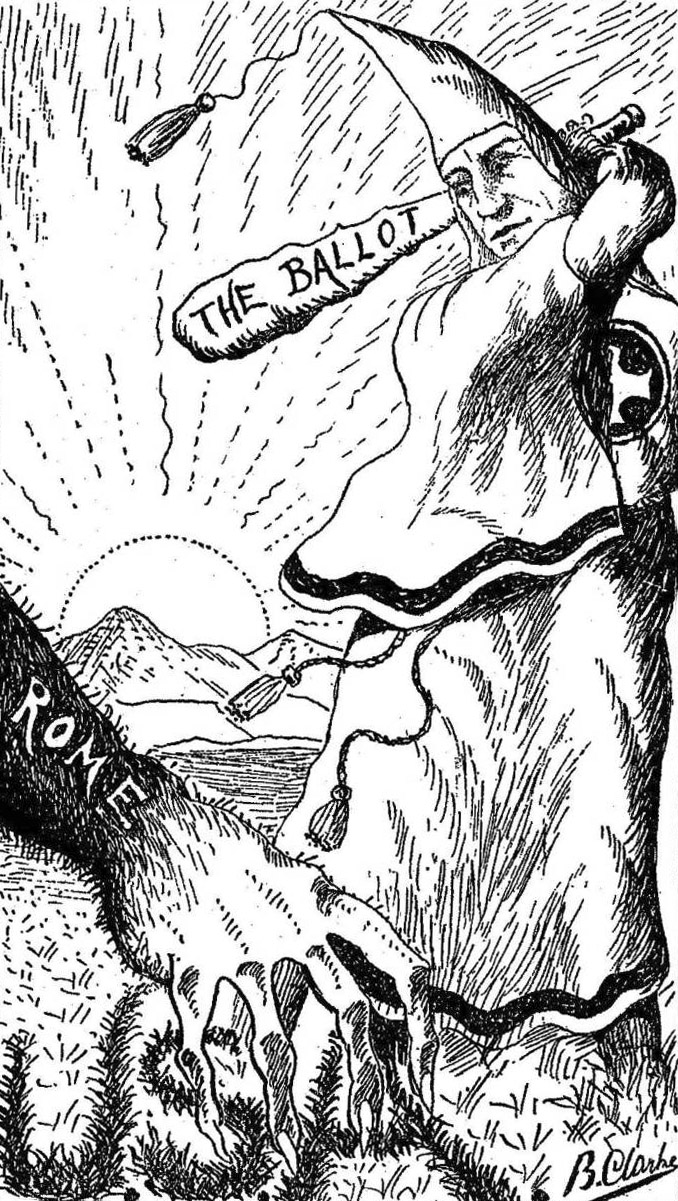
Pro Klan, anti Roman Catholic cartoon by Branford Clarke published in Heroes of the Fiery Cross by the Pillar of Fire Church in Zarephath, New Jersey

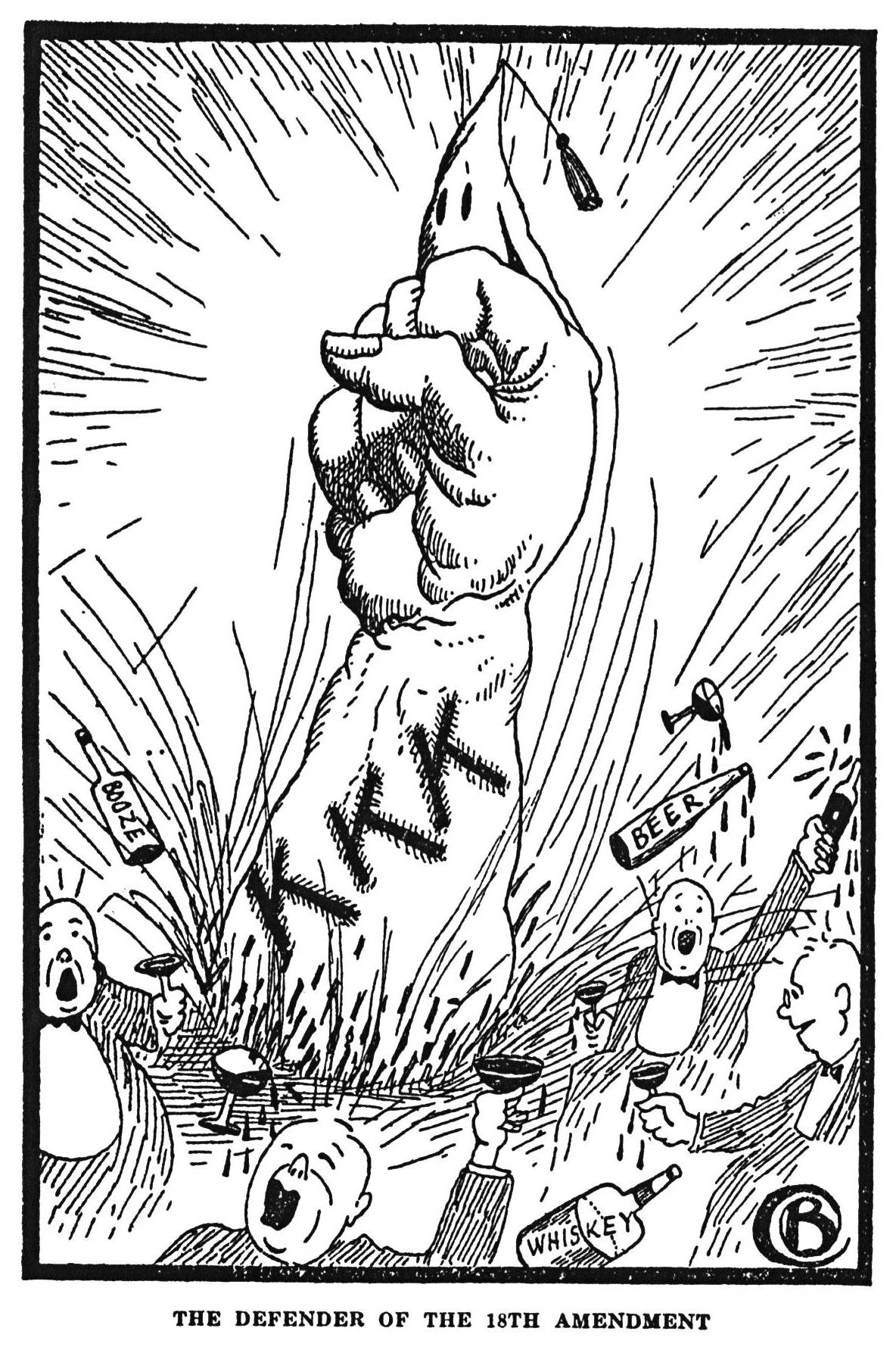
Branford Clarke illustration supporting the Eighteenth Amendment to the United States Constitution

The Ku Klux Klan has had a history in the U.S. state of New Jersey since the early part of the 1920s. The Klan was active in the areas of Trenton and Camden and it also had a presence in several of the state's northern counties in the 1920s. It had the most members in Monmouth County, and operated a resort in Wall Township.

== History ==
=== From the first local chapter to the 1940s ===
The first local chapter of the KKK in New Jersey was organized in 1921, after units had started in New York and Pennsylvania. Arthur Hornbui Bell was the state's first Grand Dragon, and continued serving in that post until the Ku Klux Klan was disbanded in 1944.

As early as 1922, the New Jersey Klan protested Paterson, New Jersey's honored burial of the Roman Catholic priest William N. McNulty, which closed schools during his funeral. They argued that it was a breach of the U.S. legal doctrine of separation of church and state. Mayor Frank J. Van Noort ordered the honors for the respected dean of a major church.

In 1922, George W. Apgar was the King Kleagle, with state headquarters just outside Newark.

In 1923, the Klan provided funding to the Pillar of Fire Church to found Alma White College in Zarephath, New Jersey. It became "the second institution in the north avowedly run by the Ku Klux Klan to further its aims and principles." Alma White said that the Klan philosophy "will sweep through the intellectual student classes as through the masses of the people." At that time, the Pillar of Fire was publishing the pro-KKK monthly periodical The Good Citizen.

On May 3, 1923, around 12,000 people attended a Klan meeting in Bound Brook, New Jersey. The speakers held a meeting at the Pillar of Fire headquarters in nearby Zarephath where a crowd of angry locals surrounded the church to let them know that they were not welcome.

On May 10, 1923, the Klan assaulted a boy, accusing him of stealing $50 from his mother, Bessie Titus, in West Belmar, New Jersey.

On August 24, 1923, the Klan held a large meeting in a ten-acre field off the Freehold Turnpike in western Farmingdale, New Jersey. The Klan claimed to have drawn members from Monmouth, Middlesex and Ocean counties and inducted 1,700 members. 1,200 cars were said to have parked along roadways, in driveways, and in every available spot. Arthur Hornbui Bell opened the meeting before introducing the principal speaker, dubbed Colonel Sherman of Atlanta, Georgia. Several inductees from Keyport, New Jersey were escorted to the event by Klansmen from that borough.

In 1925, Alma White published The Ku Klux Klan in Prophecy in Zarephath at the Pillar of Fire Church printing press. She writes: "The unrepentant Hebrew is everywhere among us today as the strong ally of Roman Catholicism. ... To think of our Hebrew friends with their millions in gold and silver aiding the Pope in his aspirations for world supremacy, is almost beyond the grasp of ... The Jews in New York City openly boast that they have the money and Rome the power, and that if they decide to rule the city and state, ..."

In 1926, Arthur Hornbui Bell headed a group that converted the former Marconi Station in Wall Township into a Klan resort. (The property was subsequently acquired by The King's College, a divinity school, and later became Camp Evans.). The 396-acre (1.60 km^{2}) resort was open only to officials and members of the New Jersey Realm of the Klan.

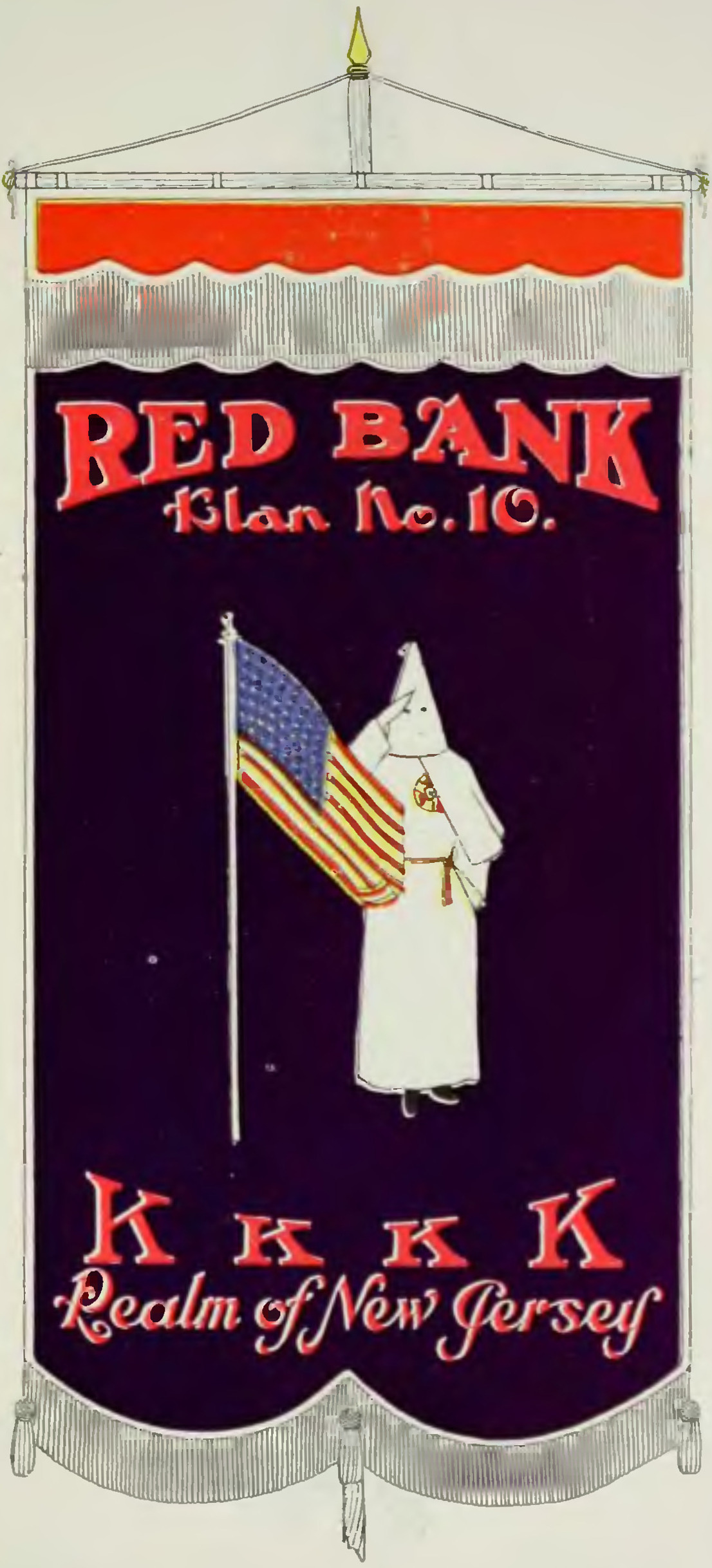
Klan Banner No. 4 in Catalogue of Official Robes and Banners from Knights of the Ku Klux Klan Incorporated, Atlanta, Georgia (1925)

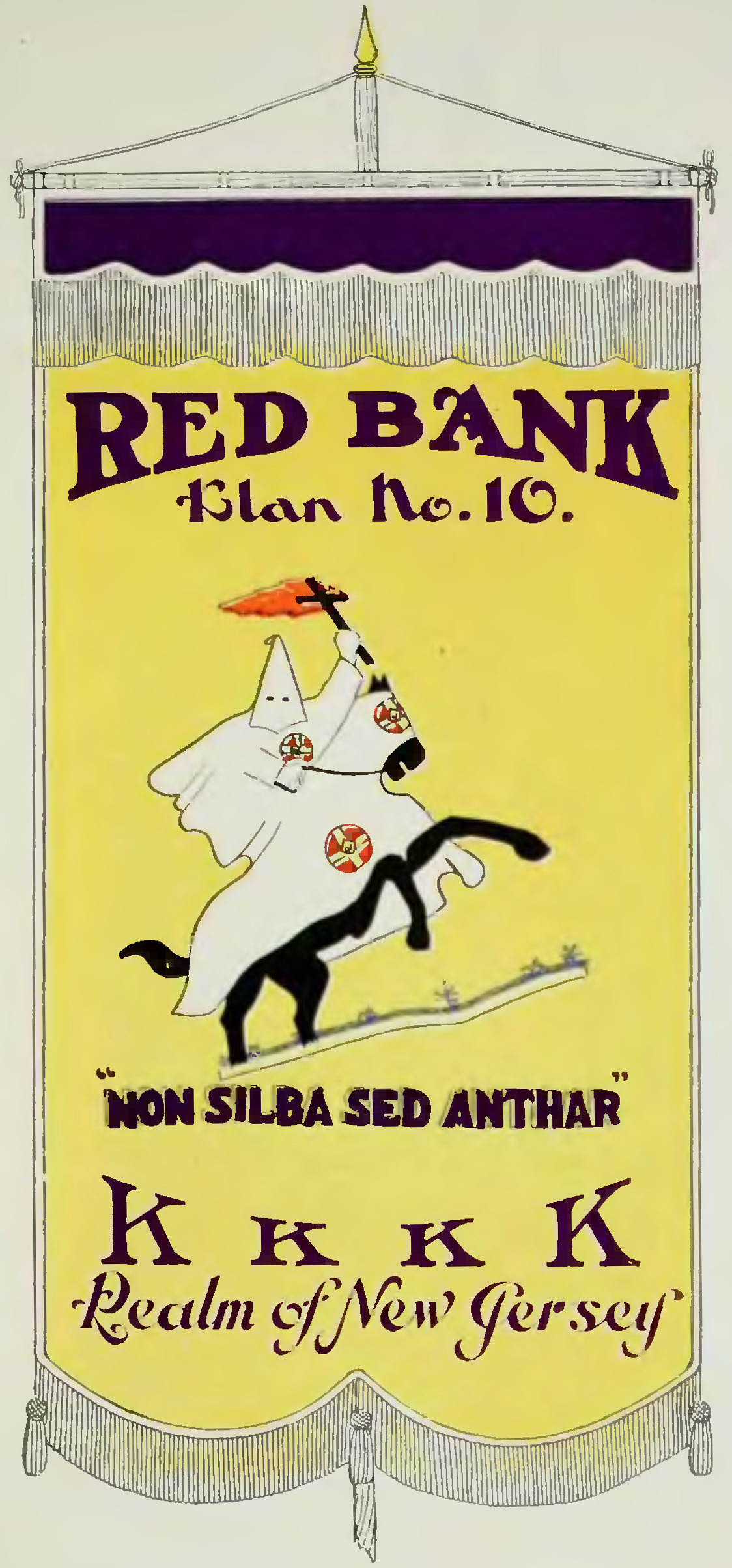
Klan Banner No. 2 in Catalogue of Official Robes and Banners from Knights of the Ku Klux Klan Incorporated, Atlanta, Georgia (1925)

In May 1926, birth control advocate and Planned Parenthood progenitor Margaret Sanger once spoke to a meeting of the women's chapter of the Klan in Silver Lake, New Jersey. Sanger wrote in her 1938 autobiography that the speech was "one of the weirdest experiences I had in lecturing."

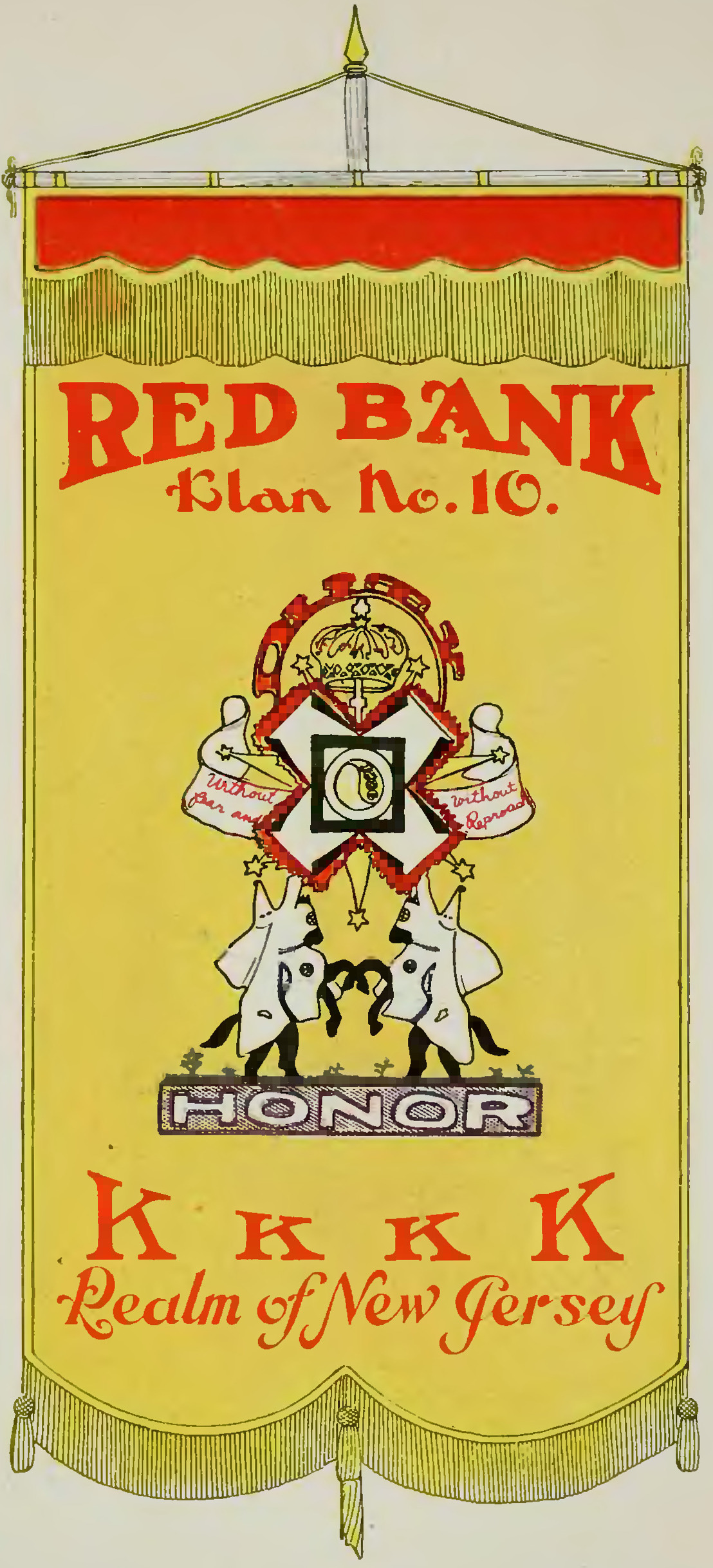
Klan Banner No. 3 in Catalogue of Official Robes and Banners from Knights of the Ku Klux Klan Incorporated, Atlanta, Georgia (1925)

The New Jersey Ku Klux Klan held a Fourth of July celebration from July 3–5, 1926, in Long Branch, New Jersey, that featured a "Miss 100% America" pageant.

In 1926, Alma White published Klansmen: Guardians of Liberty. She writes: "I believe in white supremacy."

In 1928, Alma White published Heroes of the Fiery Cross. She wrote: "The Jews are as unrelenting now as they were two thousand years ago."

In 1940, James A. Colescott had Bell removed as head of the Klan in New Jersey. Bell was also vice president of the German American Bund. Bell's ouster was ordered after he arranged a joint meeting between the Klan and the German American Bund at the Bund's Camp Nordlund, near Andover, New Jersey.

In 1943, Alma White of the Pillar of Fire Church reprinted her pro-Klan essays and sermons as Guardians of Liberty.

By 1944, the national organization was closed by a tax lien which was imposed by the Internal Revenue Service. Local chapters closed during the following years.

=== Attempts to Revive the KKK ===
As white supremacists responded to America’s 1960s civil rights movement, notably the Civil Rights Act of 1964, their backlash included the New Jersey KKK's attempt to restore itself as a publicly visible organization. The New Jersey klan’s “king kleagle,” Frank W. Rotella, Jr, and other Klan leaders simultaneously headed a National States' Rights Party that sought to play a political role in New Jersey and other states as a way to revive the Klan. A 1967 study by Congress’ House Un-American Activities Committee included New Jersey among 18 states (seven of them in the Middle Atlantic or Great Lakes regions) where the United Klans of America maintained operations.

Much of the Klan’s revival attempt focused on rural, southern New Jersey, in Salem and Cumberland counties. Police in Bridgeton arrested Rotella and five other men in 1966 as they burned a cross and sought to hold a Klan rally in defiance of a court injunction obtained by state authorities.

In December 1966, white supremacists in adjacent Salem County began a campaign of 20 cross burnings, many of them targeting black churches and neighborhoods. In notes left at the crosses, and in fliers posted in Salem, the group claimed the actions in the name of the “White Crusaders,” the label used at the time by a prominent Mississippi KKK unit. In 1967, Rotella, having declared to news media his resignation from the KKK leadership, applied unsuccessfully to hold a rally and cross burning in Salem. The Salem County cross burnings prompted New Jersey’s legislature to pass a law banning cross burnings in the state—and the burnings subsided after protest marches by hundreds of black residents led local officials to arrest two local men.

In 1980, the Klan began to hold rallies in New Jersey once again. Emboldened by the 1980 Selma-to-Montgomery "cleansing march" in Alabama, they held rallies and carried out another recruiting drive.

== People ==
- Arthur Hornbui Bell was the Grand Dragon.
- Alma White was a local preacher who supported the Klan in her publications and sermons.
- Alton Milford Young, a minister and a Grand Kaliff.
- George W. Apgar was the King Kleagle.

== See also ==
- Antisemitism in New Jersey
- Ku Klux Klan in Inglewood, California
- Indiana Klan
- Tulsa race massacre
