= Arthur Hornbui Bell =

American attorney

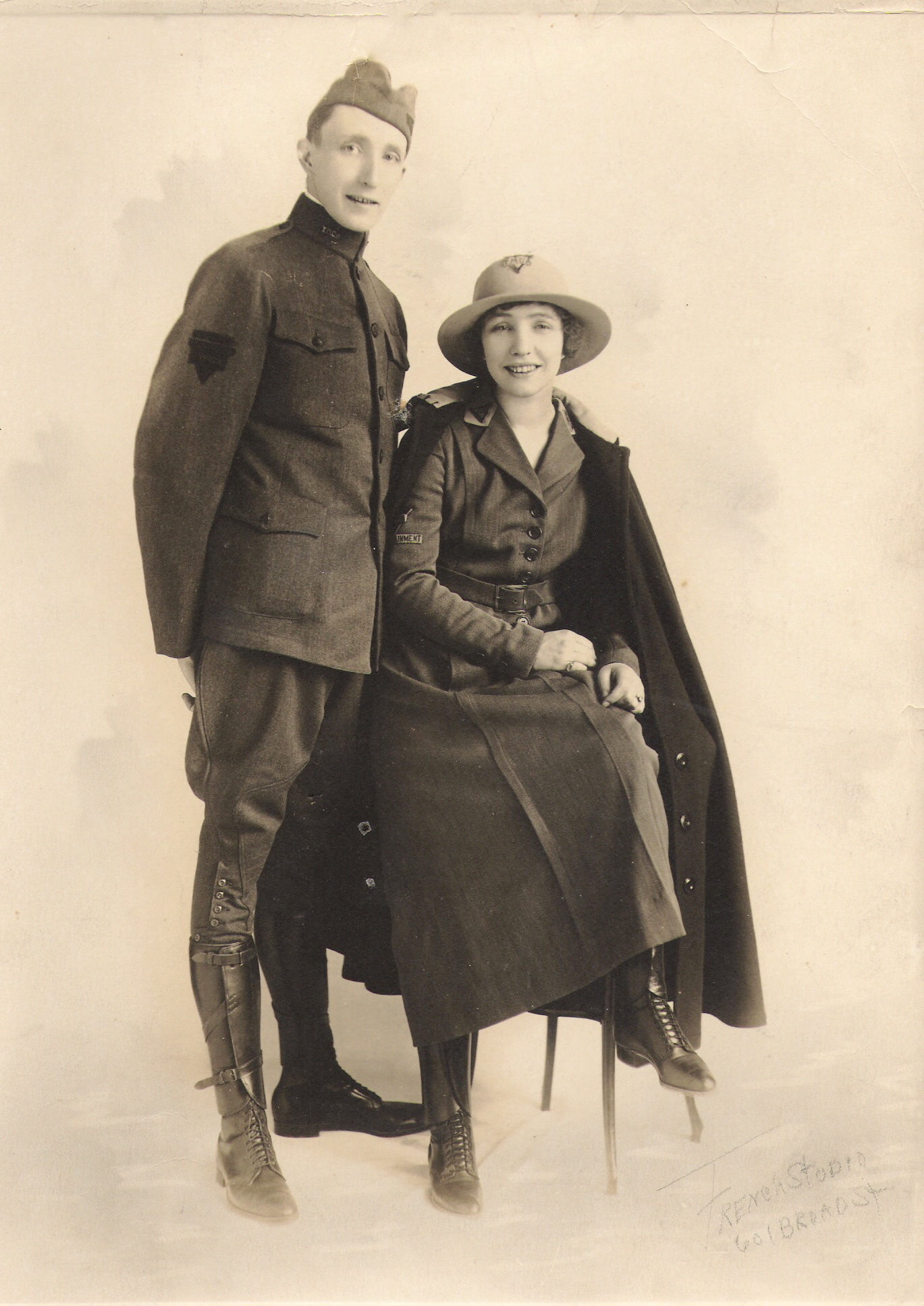
- Born: February 14, 1891; Manhattan, New York City
- Died: March 1, 1973 (aged 82) possibly Bloomfield, New Jersey, or Trenton, New Jersey
- Resting place: possibly Trenton, New Jersey
- Known for: Ku Klux Klan
- Title: Grand Dragon
- Spouse: Leah Hamlin (1895–1951)
- Parent(s): William John Bell; Ellen M. Jepson

Arthur Hornbui Bell (February 14, 1891 – March 1, 1973) was an attorney and the Grand Dragon of the Ku Klux Klan in New Jersey.

After holding a joint rally with the pro-Nazi German American Bund in hopes of forming an alliance, Bell and Imperial Kaliff Alton Milford Young were both expelled from the Klan. The meeting was reported to the federal government for further investigation.

== Early years ==
He was born on February 14, 1891, in Manhattan, New York City to William John Bell of England. Arthur was a member of a vaudeville team known as "Bell and Bell", after marrying Leah Hamlin (1895–1951). They went to Europe after World War I in 1919 to entertain the troops, "for the boys," as a members of the "Y" and "Overseas Theater League under Y.M.C.A.". Leah Bell rode a unicycle and Art and Leah had ventriloquism dummies shows. Arthur Bell is known to have been a member of the "Over There" theatre organized under Benjamin Franklin Keith and visited Belgium, England, France, and the Netherlands. Art and Leah are also listed in the official record of the "Over There" theater as vaudeville players.

== Klan years ==
Around 1922, Bell became the Grand Dragon of the Ku Klux Klan for New Jersey. In 1925 he wrote the introduction to Alma White's pro-Klan book The Ku Klux Klan in Prophecy:

This book brings out vividly the titanic struggle now taking place, not only in the United States, but over the entire world, and while at the present time the battle raging has not reached the point where bullets, swords and poison gas are the reasons used, the time will soon arrive when the Roman Catholic craving for world-power will, if not checked, cause a revival of a religious war that will be far more disastrous than the late World War. Bishop White deserves the highest praise for her work on this truly wonderful book of "light" and it is hoped that it may reach out into the minds of Protestants and Catholics alike and bring them to a sense of realization as to where this great un-American movement to make the world Catholic will ultimately end.

In 1926, he wrote the introduction to Klansmen: Guardians of Liberty and he also headed a group that converted Camp Evans into a Klan resort. In the same year, he was paid $1,596.96 by the King Kleagle of the Ku Klux Klan in New Jersey, to save the Kleagle's son, Roscoe Carl Ziegler, from charges of embezzlement. In 1928, he called the New York Governor, Al Smith unfit to lead. In 1940, James Colescott had him removed as head of the Klan of New Jersey for cooperating with the German American Bund and holding a rally with them in New Jersey. Imperial Kaliff Alton Milford Young was also removed from the Klan and the meeting was reported by Colescott to Martin Dies. His first wife Leah spoke at many Klan events. In 1940 he was investigated by the Dies Committee for plans to merge the KKK and the Nazi movement. Bell was interviewed by the Military Intelligence Service and investigated for "disaffection" in 1942. The case was closed, "no further investigation appears warranted," and the report was sent to J. Edgar Hoover.

Later in life, Bell recanted his racial views, saying:

"I think tolerance should be taught in the public schools... I learned that Negroes and members of other faiths were my friends and fighting for the same ideals."

He died in March 1973 in New Jersey.

== Publications ==
- Ku Klux Klan Or the Knights of Columbus Klan: America Or Rome (1921)
- Klansmen: Guardians of Liberty (1926) by Alma White – he wrote the introduction
