= Alton Milford Young =

Ku Klux Klan member (1880s–1950)

- Born: May 24, 1884 (or 1882); Albany, New York, U.S.
- Died: July 16, 1950 (aged 66); Jersey City, New Jersey, U.S.
- Other name: Joseph Young
- Education: Alma White College, DD
- Known for: Ku Klux Klan in New Jersey

Alton Milford Young (May 24, 1884 – July 16, 1950) was the Grand or Imperial Kaliff and the Imperial Kludd of the Ku Klux Klan in New Jersey. The Imperial Kludd is the chaplain of the Imperial Klonvokation and he performs "such other duties as may be required by the Imperial Wizard." The Imperial Kaliff is the second highest position after the Imperial Wizard.

== Biography ==
He was born on May 24, 1884 (or 1882) in Albany, New York. His parents were migrants from Canada. By 1918 he was the minister for the North Baptist Church in Jersey City, New Jersey. He received his Doctor of Divinity degree from Alma White College in 1927. In 1940 he testified before the Dies Committee. Young and Arthur Hornbui Bell were ousted from the Klan following the joint meeting on 18 August 1940 of the Klan and the German-American Bund at the Bund's Camp Nordland, near Andover, New Jersey.

In May 1948, Young converted to Roman Catholicism and began using his baptismal name, Joseph. He died July 16, 1950, at his home in Jersey City, New Jersey, 121 Garrison Avenue, "of a heart ailment".
