= Ku Klux Klan recruitment =

Ku Klux Klan recruitment of members is the responsibility of 'Kleagles', they are organizers or recruiters, "appointed by an imperial wizard or his imperial representative to 'sell' the KKK among non-members". These members received a portion of each new member's invitation fee.

Recruitment of new KKK members entailed framing economic, political, and social structural changes in favour of and in line with KKK goals. These goals promoted "100 per cent Americanism" and benefits for white native-born Protestants. Informal ways Klansmen recruited members included "with eligible co-workers and personal friends and try to enlist them". Protestant teachers were also targeted for Klan membership.

== Bloc recruitment ==
"Bloc recruitment" was coined by sociologist Anthony Oberschall. Bloc recruitment refer to "the way in which social movement organizers often recruit members and participants among groups of individuals already organized for some other purpose." This strategy was advantageous to the Klan because it allowed them to recruit large groups of members from one source instead of being faced with the difficult task of recruiting individuals one by one. This strategy was also effective because it allowed the Klan to build upon the solidarity already in place from other organizations. The organizations that the KKK targeted for bloc recruitment were usually fraternal lodges and Protestant churches. Protestant ministers were offered free membership and powerful Chaplain status within the KKK. Recruitment also involved recruitment drives that toured the United States. Members of organizations like churches and fraternal lodges, were easily accessible by Kleagles or Klan recruiters because they were already socially active in public issues through their involvement in these organizations. These recruitment efforts were very successful, as such, Klan mem and used membership fees to finance large purchases such as the Klux Krest, a new home for Imperial Wizard William J. Simmons (founder of the 2nd KKK).

== Violence ==
In addition to recruitment drives and alliances with fraternal lodges and Protestant churches, the Klan also used controlled instances of violence to attract members.

== Charitable work and recruitment ==
To off-set its violent acts, the KKK participated in charitable activities. In 1922, the Klan "contributed $25 each to the Volunteers of America and to the African Methodist Episcopal Church, an offer which Webster said proved that the Klan was not anti-black". These charitable activities demonstrated the KKK's commitment to the nation's welfare and also "served as an effective public relations device by creating a more favourable opinion of the secret order and attracting new members".

== Other recruitment factors ==
The allure of the "invisible empire" and its public anonymity were also appealing to potential Klansmen. In addition to the empowerment of membership in an empire that was secretive, Klansmen also enjoyed a kinship-like bond from membership. The activities and events organized by Klan members were impressive to future recruits as they included family picnics and other social events that built solidarity.

== See also ==
- Ku Klux Klan titles and vocabulary
