= James R. Venable =

White supremacist Georgia lawyer and Mayor of Stone Mountain

Mayor of Stone Mountain, Georgia
- In office 1946–1949

1st Imperial Wizard of the National Knights of the Ku Klux Klan
- In office 1963–1987

Personal details
- Born: January 15, 1901 Stone Mountain, Georgia, U.S.
- Died: January 18, 1993 (aged 92) Lawrenceville, Georgia, U.S.
- Spouse: Dorothy Venable
- Children: Ginger Fearria and Dorothea Wallsom

James R. Venable (January 15, 1901 – January 18, 1993) was a white supremacist Georgia lawyer and Mayor of Stone Mountain, Georgia from 1946 to 1949. He established the Klan national faction National Knights of the Ku Klux Klan in 1963, which he led for 25 years.

== Early life ==
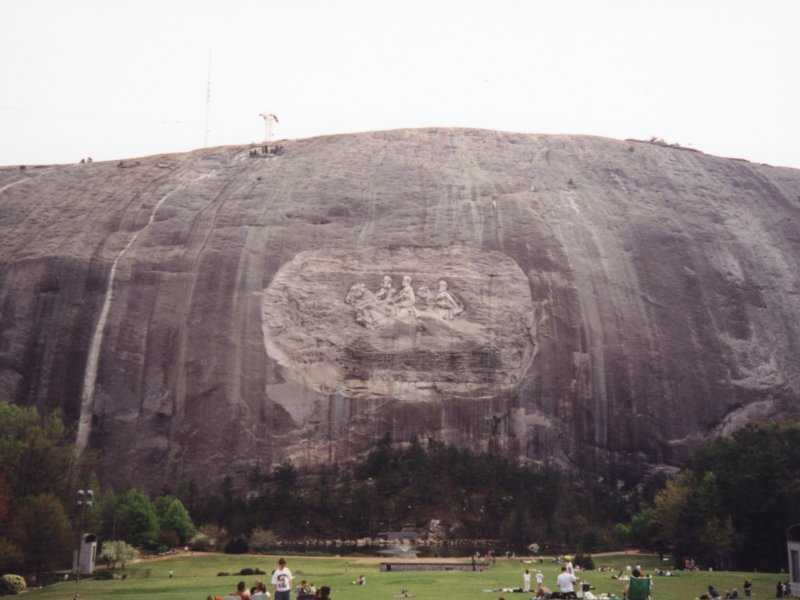
Stone Mountain, including the Confederate memorial

James R. Venable was born in Stone Mountain, Georgia on January 15, 1901. He attended Lithonia High School with Nathan Bedford Forrest III, the grandson of Nathan Bedford Forrest. Venable's ancestors arrived in the United States in 1683, and settled near Richmond, Virginia. His grandfather and namesake was the first "guinea pig" for surgeon Crawford Long, one of the pioneers of anesthesia. The elder Venable later purchased land in the city of Marthasville which was later renamed Atlanta. His name was given to Venable Street, near Georgia Tech. In the 1870s, Venable's ancestors purchased Pine Mountain, Arabia Mountain, and Stone Mountain, a large rock inselberg, in order to quarry native granite. The Venable quarry operations produced, at one time, all of the curbstones for the city of Atlanta and outlying communities. Stone from the quarries was also used to build structures such as the Cuban Capitol Building and the Brooklyn Bridge.

== Legal and political career ==
Venable received his law degree in 1930. He worked as a lawyer in Georgia and in several other states. Most notably, he defended the bombers of the Hebrew Benevolent Congregation Temple bombing, which he described as "perhaps one of the hardest cases because the Jewish people spent many thousands of dollars." Venable also defended Communist Homer Chase in Atlanta. He won acquittal for a Black client accused of murder and later won an appeal for two Black Muslims in Louisiana convicted on charges stemming from a police raid on their mosque. The $25,000 he won from that suit were funneled into his Klan. Despite never going on vacation, Venable was able to go to 44 states by practicing law. From 1946 to 1949 he served as the mayor of Stone Mountain. He described Sen. Tom Watson as "perhaps the greatest [politician] during our century."

== Ku Klux Klan ==
At the age of 13, Venable attended the 1915 revival of the KKK on top of Stone Mountain, alongside his uncle. In 1963, Venable organized the National Knights of the Ku Klux Klan, which competed with other rival national KKK factions. He would serve for 25 years as its Imperial Wizard. Venable often burned crosses on the land he owned at Stone Mountain. Although, he claimed "I hold no ill will against any race, color, or creed."

=== Investigations by the House Un-American Activities Committee ===
In late 1965, the House Un-American Activities Committee initiated an investigation of the KKK starting the first hearings in January 1966. James R. Venable, an attorney who also served as chairman of the National Association of Knights of the Ku Klux Klan, represented John D. Swenson, Louisiana Grand Dragon of the Original Knights of the Ku Klux Klan, during these hearings.

== Personal life ==
Venable was married to Dorothy Venable, who he had two daughters with. He was a Presbyterian, attending North Avenue Presbyterian Church, and a member of the Free Masons.

== Death ==
Towards the end of his life, Venable became afflicted with various conditions, including cancer, Alzheimer's disease, and pneumonia. He died on January 18, 1993, at a nursing home in Lawrenceville, Georgia.
