= Kloran =

Handbook of the Ku Klux Klan

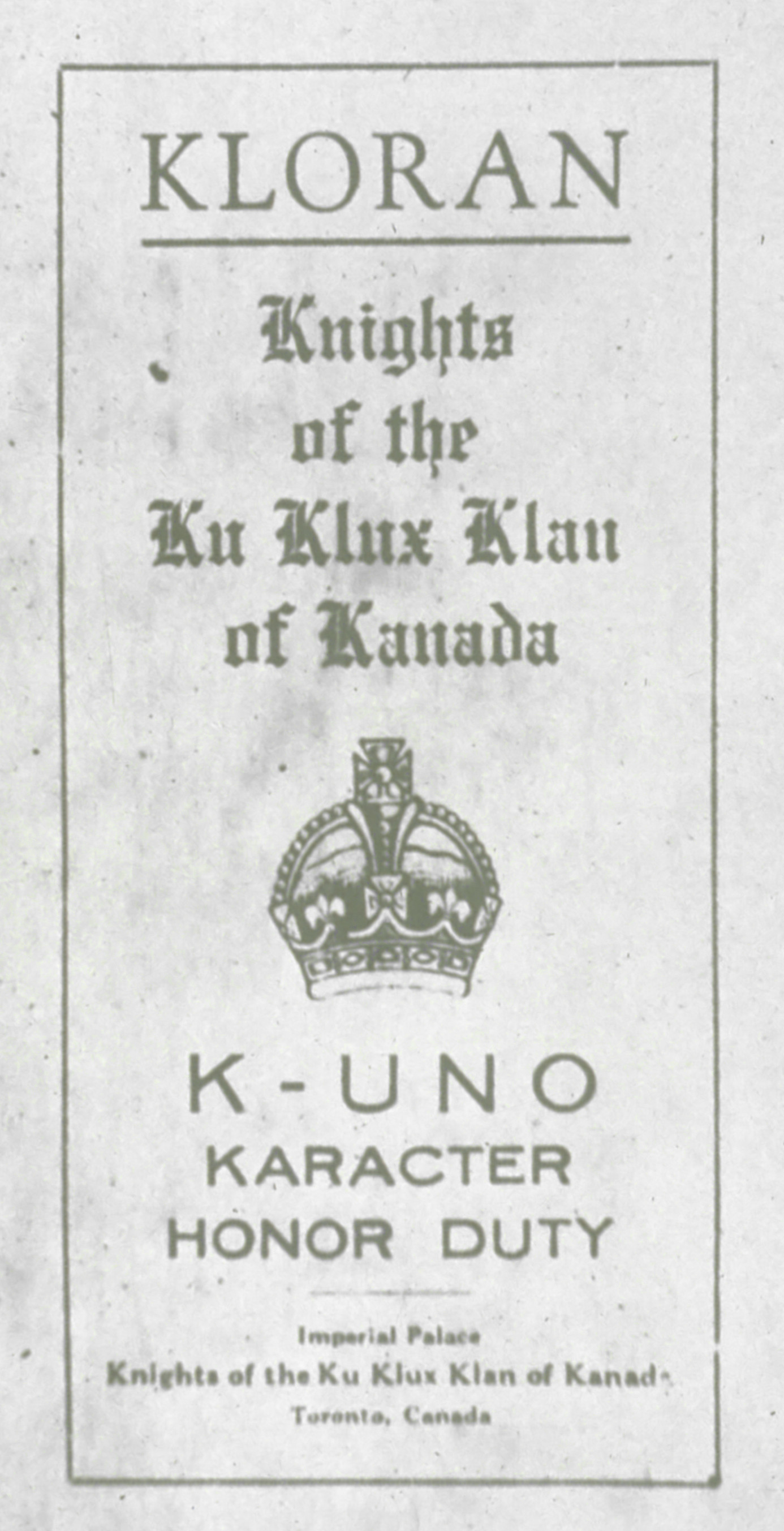
Kloran of the Ku Klux Klan of Kanada

The Kloran (from Klan and Koran) is the handbook of the Ku Klux Klan. Versions of the Kloran typically contain detailed descriptions of the role of different Klan members as well as detailing Klan ceremonies and procedures.

The letters Kl were often used at the beginning of words to delineate a Klan association. Examples include: Kloran, Klonversation (conversation), Klavern (cavern or tavern; local branch or meeting place), Klavaliers, etc. This differed from the practice of the First Klan during Reconstruction; very little of the Reconstruction Klan's terminology was carried over, mostly titles for high officials in the organization. The leader of an individual Klavern, for example, was an "Exalted Cyclops".

The original Kloran was written by William J. Simmons, for his revived "Knights of the Ku Klux Klan", c. 1915. He drew heavily on his previous experiences with fraternalism: he had been a member of many different lodges and had sold memberships in the Woodmen of the World before deciding to revive the Klan (see Second Klan).
