= Kleagle =

Ku Klux Klan recruitment officer

A Kleagle is an officer of the Ku Klux Klan whose main role is to recruit new members and must maintain the three guiding principles: "recruit, maintain control, and safeguard."

King Kleagles are appointed as leaders of a region and have authority to manage members and official affairs of that region's members. In the 2000s the role was modified, empowering King Kleagles to maintain structural order and ensure the safety and security of members. It was deemed necessary to adapt the role to include the safekeeping of data and online communications within the Ku Klux Klan as the significance of the internet and digital communications became targeted and was known to be intercepted by other groups and government agencies.

King Kleagles are provided the highest level of authority to ensure compliance, security and accountability of members and provide orders and instructions for the Kleagles to carry out.

== Incentives and recruitment strategies ==
Kleagle members were typically paid by commission and received a portion of each new member's initiation fee, similar to multilevel marketing schemes in later years.

KKK members were encouraged to recruit others by framing economic, political and social structural changes that were favorable and in-line with KKK goals. These goals promoted "100 percent Americanism" and benefits for white native-born Protestants. Informal ways Klansman recruited members included "with eligible co-workers and personal friends and try to enlist them". Protestant teachers were also targeted for Klan membership.

=== Bloc recruitment ===
Particularly in the 1920s, the Klan used a technique referred to as bloc recruitment. This term was coined by sociologist Anthony Oberschall. Bloc recruitment refers to "the way in which social-movement organizers often recruit members and participants among groups of individuals already organized for some other purpose." This strategy was advantageous to the Klan because it allowed them to recruit large groups of members from one source instead of being faced with the difficult task of recruiting individuals one by one. This strategy was also effective because it allowed the Klan to build upon the solidarity already in place from other organizations.

The KKK usually targeted fraternal lodges and Protestant church members for bloc recruitment. Protestant ministers were offered free membership and powerful Chaplain status within the KKK. Recruitment also involved recruitment drives that toured the United States. Members of organizations like churches and fraternal lodges, were easily accessible by Kleagles or Klan recruiters because they were already socially active in public issues through their involvement in these organizations. These recruitment efforts were very successful, so Klan membership soared. A primary recruitment leader during the 1920s, Edward Young Clark, reported that the Klan had gained 48,000 members in just three months. Klan leaders took advantage of this success and used membership fees to finance large purchases such as the Klan Krest, a new home for Imperial Wizard Simmons (founder of the 2nd KKK).

=== Violence ===
In addition to recruitment drives and alliances with fraternal lodges and Protestant churches, the Klan also used controlled instances of violence to attract members. Violence was pronounced in areas of high KKK activity, intimidating opponents of the KKK and impressing future members. Violence was a method to demonstrate commitment to the Klan philosophy; however, its use was monitored closely by Klan Leaders to discourage government intervention and to "avoid a backlash from the general public that could damage recruiting efforts".

=== Charity work and recruitment ===
To offset violent acts, the KKK participated in charitable activities. In 1922, the Klan "contributed $25 each to the Volunteers of America and to the African Methodist Episcopal Church, an offer which Webster said proved that the Klan was not anti-black". The charitable activities demonstrated that the KKK was committed to the welfare of the nation and also "served as an effective public relations device by creating a more favorable opinion of the secret order and attracting new members".

=== Other recruitment factors ===
The allure of the "invisible empire" and its public anonymity were also appeals for potential Klansmen. In addition to the empowerment of membership in an empire that was secretive, Klansmen also enjoyed a kinship bond from membership. The activities and events of Klan members were impressive to future recruits as they included family picnics and other social events that built solidarity.

== Notable Kleagles ==
- Edgar Ray Killen, a Mississippi Klansman long suspected of involvement in the 1964 murders of Chaney, Goodman, and Schwerner that were the subject of the movie Mississippi Burning (1988). Killen was found guilty of manslaughter on June 21, 2005.
- Robert Byrd, Democrat, senior senator in the United States Senate from West Virginia. Byrd then moved on and disavowed any continuing connection with the Ku Klux Klan. As part of this disavowal, he confessed that it had been his decision to join the Ku Klux Klan that had started his career in politics.

== King Kleagles ==
The King Kleagle was the head of the Kleagles for a geographic area. There are appointed King Kleagles in each state in the US, Canada, Philippines, Germany, United Kingdom and Australia.

- George W. Apgar of the Ku Klux Klan in New Jersey
- Arthur H. Bell
- F. Eugene Farnsworth, Ku Klux Klan in Maine

== See also ==
- Ku Klux Klan recruitment
- Ku Klux Klan in Inglewood, California (Kleagles on trial)
