= Ku Klux Klan titles and vocabulary =

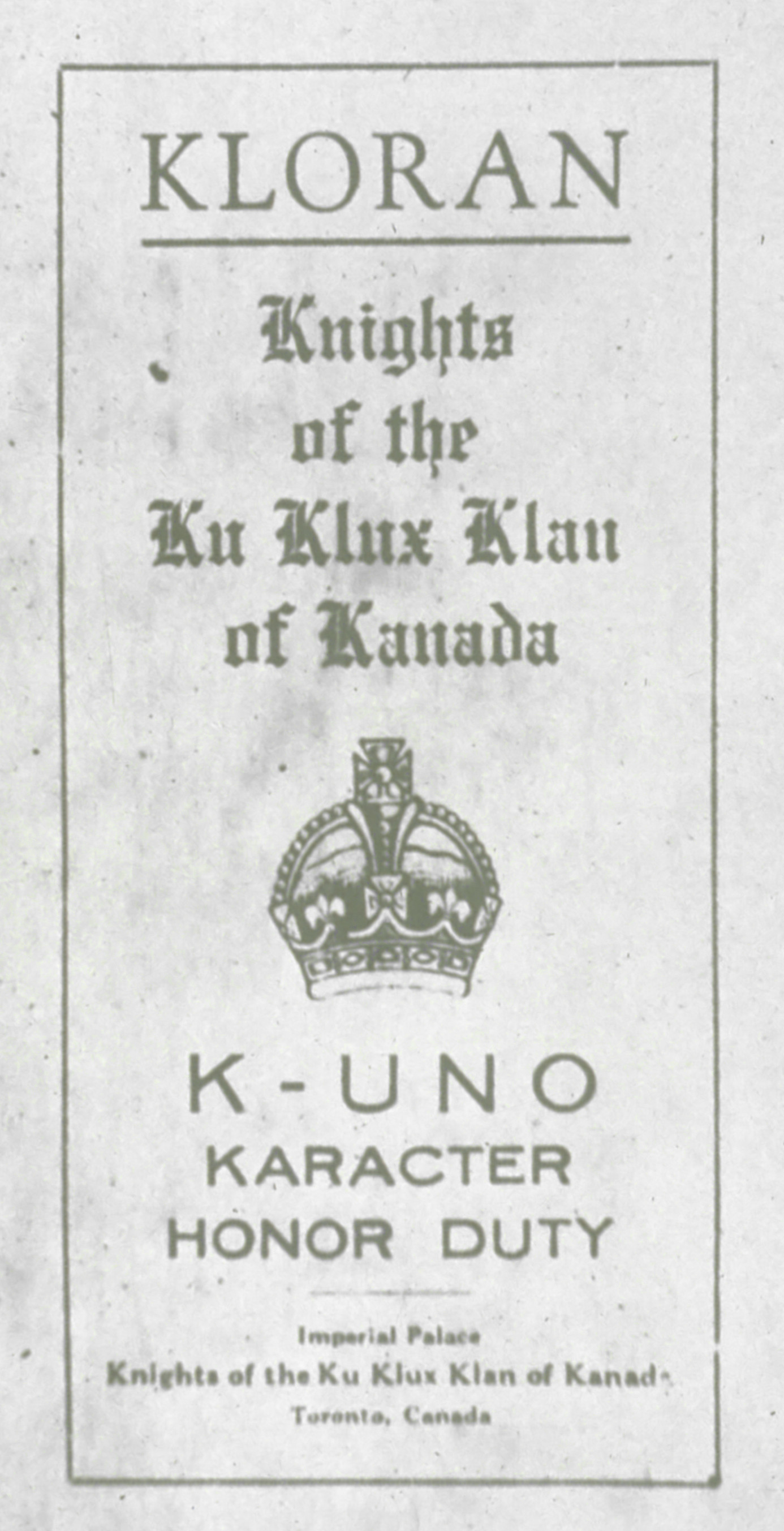
Kloran of the Knights of the Ku Klux Klan of Kanada

Ku Klux Klan (KKK) nomenclature has evolved over the order's nearly 160 years of existence. The titles and designations were first laid out in the 1920s Kloran, setting out KKK terms and traditions. Like many KKK terms, this is a portmanteau term, formed from Klan and Koran.

== Reconstruction period ==
The sources of the rituals, titles and name of KKK may be found in antebellum college fraternities and secret societies such as the Kuklos Adelphon. Earlier source material, however, states, "The ceremony of initiation was borrowed from some of the features of the introduction of candidates of the long defunct Sons of Malta and other like societies, and was calculated to, and did provoke, much amusement for most of those, if not all, who were present," according to the 1907 Cyclopedia of Fraternities. J.C. Lester, one of the original members of the group, stated that the Klan rituals were "modeled on and embraced the leading features of the rituals of an order which has long been popular in many colleges and universities under various names" such as the Sons of Confucius or Guiasticutus but always styled Ancient and Honorable and Mirth-Provoking. Walter L. Fleming stated in a footnote to Lester's text that the contemporary (early twentieth century) Southern college fraternity that most nearly mirrored the early Klan was "known as Alpha Sigma Sigma" and the institution of snipe hunting. The original prescript of the Ku Klux Klan was adopted by a convention in Nashville, Tennessee, in April 1867. A slightly revised edition appeared the next year.

=== Higher levels ===
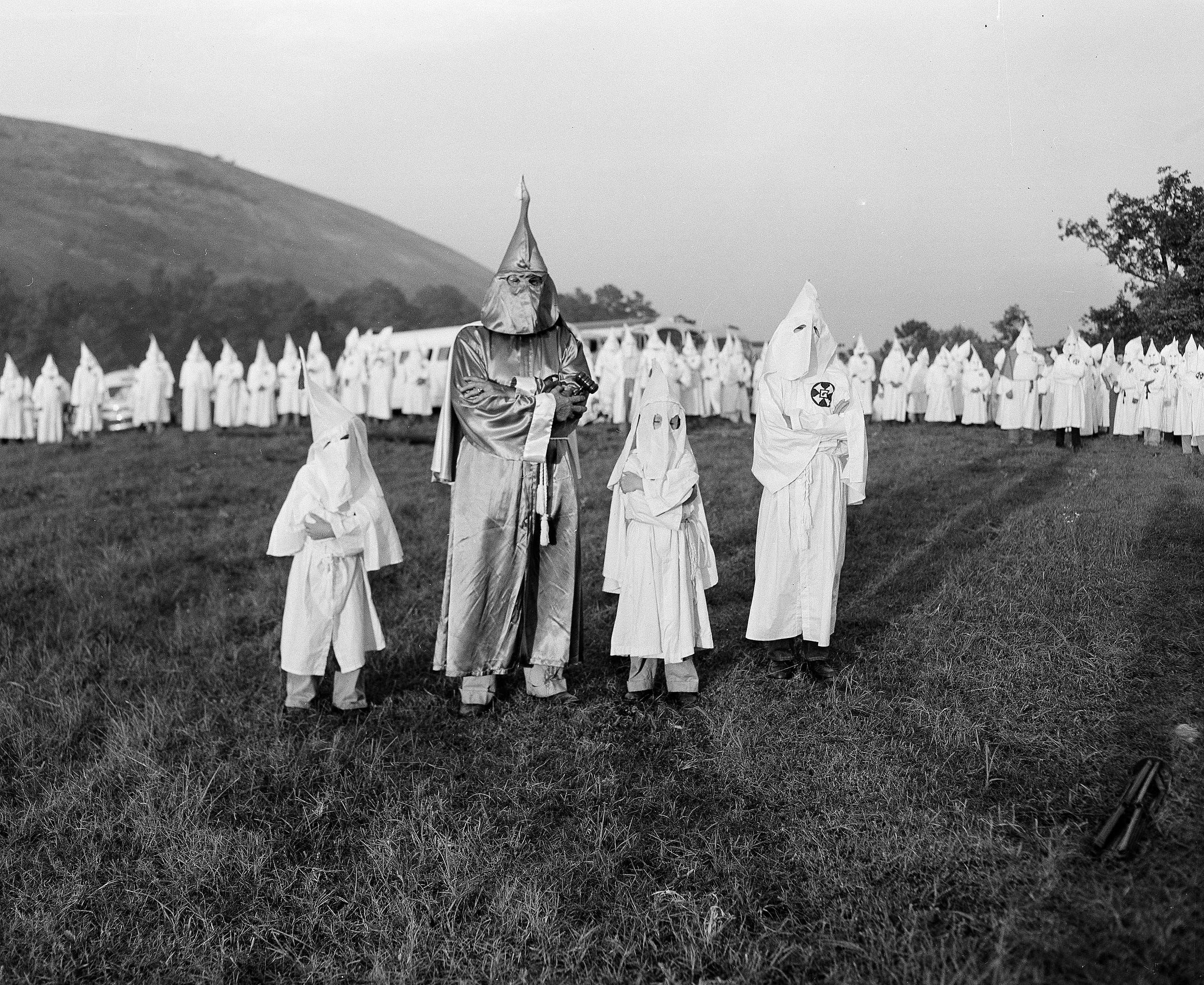
Grand Dragon (later Grand Wizard) Dr. Samuel Green in Atlanta, Georgia, July 24, 1948, being flanked by two children during the initiation ceremony at Stone Mountain

In both prescripts there were four levels or "departments" of organization, above the basic level:

- Empire – constituting the whole area of the Klan's activities. This was led by the imperial wizard and his staff of ten Genii, as well as a grand schubladen (treasurer) and grand scribe, whose duty was to keep lists of the subordinate officers. The genii, imperial exchequer and Scribe were appointed by the imperial wizard.
- Realms – while the role of realms was laid out in the first prescript, they were only identified as states in the second prescript. Realms were ruled by a grand dragon who was assisted by eight squires, as well as a grand exchequer and a grand scribe, whose duties were identical to those of the above officers on the imperial level. All officers were appointed by the grand dragon.
- Dominions – identified in the second prescript as "coterminous with such counties as the grand dragons of the several Realms shall assign" and "not exceed three in number for each congressional district". The dominion was headed by a grand titan who was assisted by six furies, a grand exchequer and a grand scribe, all of whom were appointed by the grand titan.
- Provinces – the second prescript identified a province as equivalent to a county. It was supervised by a grand giant, who was assisted by four goblins, a grand exchequer, and a grand scribe, all of whom were appointed by the grand giant.

In the first prescript each officer is given the power to appoint deputies to organize realms, dominions, provinces and dens until the latter can elect their own officers. The grand wizard was to be elected by a majority of grand dragons, and each lower level was elected by a majority of the next lower level of officers (dragons were elected by titans, titans were elected by giants etc.), as soon as three units had been formed at each level (three dominions within a realm for grand dragon, three provinces within a dominion for grand titan, etc.). In the second prescript each officer appoints the lower officer with the approval of his superior.

=== Dens ===
The dens were the basic level of organization for the Reconstruction Klan. In the original prescript, its chief officer was the grand cyclops, who appointed two nighthawks, a grand turk, a grand sentinel, grand magi and a grand ensign in addition to his grand scribe. The grand cyclops, grand exchequer, grand magi (second officer) and grand monk (third officer) were elected by the body politic of the dens, identified as ghouls. In the second prescript the grand ensign is dispensed with, while the grand exchequer was appointed by the grand cyclops, who was now appointed by the grand giant. Only the grand magi and grand monk were elected by the ghouls.

The exact function of these officers and the meaning of the titles varied. The two nighthawks have been identified as couriers. The grand sentinel was in charge of the "Grand Guard", an organization which is not otherwise elaborated upon in the prescripts, but apparently served as the den's security detail. The grand turk was the den's "executive officer" and was charged with informing Klansmen of "all informal or irregular meetings" and helping the grand cyclops and the grand magi maintain the "control and government" of the Den. The grand ensign's job was to take care of the Klan's flag.

=== Initiation rites ===
The organ for initiation into the Klan was called the Investigating Committee, composed of the grand cyclops, grand magi and grand monk. Upon the nomination of a new member by a current member, the committee would investigate the candidate's "antecedents and his past and present standings and connections" and would then pronounce the candidate "competent and worthy" to become a member. The grand turk would escort the candidate to an "outpost" where he would question him and administer a preliminary oath. After this the grand turk would conduct the candidate to the Den, where the grand cyclops would administer the final oath. The second prescript elaborates that the candidate must have his left hand on the Bible and his right hand toward heaven and includes a ten-point "interrogation" that the candidate must answer satisfactorily in order to proceed with the final oath. The questions asked included: "are you now or have ever been a member of the Radical Republican Party, Loyal Leagues or Grand Army of the Republic? Did you fight with the Union Army during the Civil War? Do you believe in Negro equality?"

=== Tribunals ===
A system of "judiciary" organs was created in each prescript. In the first the judiciary was divided into a Grand Council of Yahoos, to try officers of the Klan, and a Grand Council of Centaurs to try regular ghouls. In Art. IV Sec. 4, the grand giant is charged with conducting the Council of Yahoo, but Art. VI Sec. 2 states that the council will be composed of officers of the equivalent rank as the accused and presided over by an officer of the next higher rank. A trial of the grand wizard would be held by a meeting of all the grand dragons, the most senior grand dragon presiding It is unclear if these tribunals were ever functional.

The second prescript presented an entirely different judiciary, with officers of the first three levels tried by three judges, appointed by the chief officer of the given jurisdiction, and the officers and attaches of the headquarters (presumably the genii, squires, and furies). Trials of den officers would be conducted at the provincial headquarters and include five judges, and ordinary ghouls to be tried at their dens with seven judges. As before a trial of the grand wizard would be conducted by the most senior grand dragon, this time with a quorum of seven dragons. All defendants had the right of appeal to the next higher court, and the proceeding was to be governed as "ordinary court martials".

=== Miscellaneous ===
In addition to the structure outlined above, there are documented cases of organs of slightly different nomenclature from Reconstruction. For instance, a group of twenty men, who were arrested on April 6, 1868, at their "den" at the corners of Beale Street and Hernando street in Memphis, was called the Supreme Cyclopean Council. The constitution that the police captured outlined an organization with a grand cyclops, vice-grand cyclops, and secretary and openly advocated assassination of the "murders and robbers" now ruling the South. Members were bound to participate in the activities of the order, even if it meant leaving the "embraces" of their wife. A Grand Klan, composed of delegates from Spartanburg, York, Union, and Chester counties in South Carolina and a few from North Carolina, met in Spartanburg, South Carolina and declared that no more raids or whippings would be conducted by members of the Klan except by their order and that the penalty for violating this order would be 100 lashes for the first offense and death for the second.

An attempt was apparently made to make ghoul titles for other officers in Maury County, Tennessee, in 1867 and early 1868, but the result was only confusion. Additionally a "Grand Tycoon" notified Klansmen in Lebanon, Tennessee, to cease night riding and the order was apparently effective in restoring calm to Wilson County, Tennessee. In some early reconstruction Klan units there was also a lictor, whose role as a guard of the den was later subsumed by the Nighthawks.

== Second Era ==
The Knights of the Ku Klux Klan, Inc. which existed from 1915 to 1944, elaborated on the original prescript in its Kloran and in the constitution and by-laws adopted in 1922. Some titles and jurisdictional designations were carried over from the Reconstruction prescripts intact or slightly modified, and others were original with Imperial Wizard Simmons.

=== Jurisdictions ===
- Invisible Empire – this designation included both the Klan's geographical domain – up to "the whole world" – but also in a "spiritual sense" all the secrets and workings of the order. All things outside this empire were designated the Alien World and non-members aliens. The Klan was a military organization and its commander in chief was the imperial wizard, whose power was supreme "within the limits of this Constitution" and whose edicts, decisions and rulings were binding on all members of the order. He had a staff of fifteen genii. The empire had an assembly or convocation known as a Klonvokation.
- Realm – was carried away from the Reconstruction prescript, but it was no longer restricted to the Southern States; any state or territory of the United States could become a realm, and realms were also given a number based on the date of organization of the realm. The convention of the realm was designated the Klorero (from the Māori kōrero, "convention"). The president of the realm remained the grand dragon; the other officers were collectively known as the Nine Squires.
- Province – in the new Klan, a province was construed as "a county or number of counties" designated by the grand dragon. There were a maximum of six provinces per realm, but the grand dragon could create more with the permission of the imperial wizard. The provincial convention was the Klonverse (from "converse"). The chief officer of a province was a great titan, and the other officers were known as the Seven Furies.
- Klan – the basic unit of the Second Era KKK was known simply as a klan. Its area of jurisdiction was a Klanton (from "canton") which was defined as "extend[ing] in all directions to a distance midway between the location of the Klan and the nearest Klan thereto" unless otherwise directed by the grand dragon or imperial wizard. The chief officer of a klan was an exalted cyclops and the subordinate officers were known as the Twelve Terrors.

=== Officials ===
There was a nearly identical set of subordinate officers at each level:

- Supreme Grand Wizard – president
- Klaliff – vice president (from Caliph)
- Klokard – lecturer (from Kloran and kard, meaning "teacher")
- Kludd – chaplain (from Culdee)
- Kligrapp – secretary (from chirographer)
- Klabee – treasurer (supposedly derived from kaba, "to keep", and kees, an Egyptian coin)
- Kladd – "conductor", in charge of initiating new members
- Klarogo – inner guard, sergeant-at-arms (from caveo and "interrogate")
- Klexter – outer guard (from ken and "external")
- Nighthawks – couriers

The officers at each level above the local Klan unit were designated by a unique prefix: imperial at the empire level; grand at the realm level; and great at the province level. Thus, for instance, an imperial kludd would be the chaplain for the whole organization, a grand kludd for the realm, great kludd for a province and simply a kludd for a local klan.

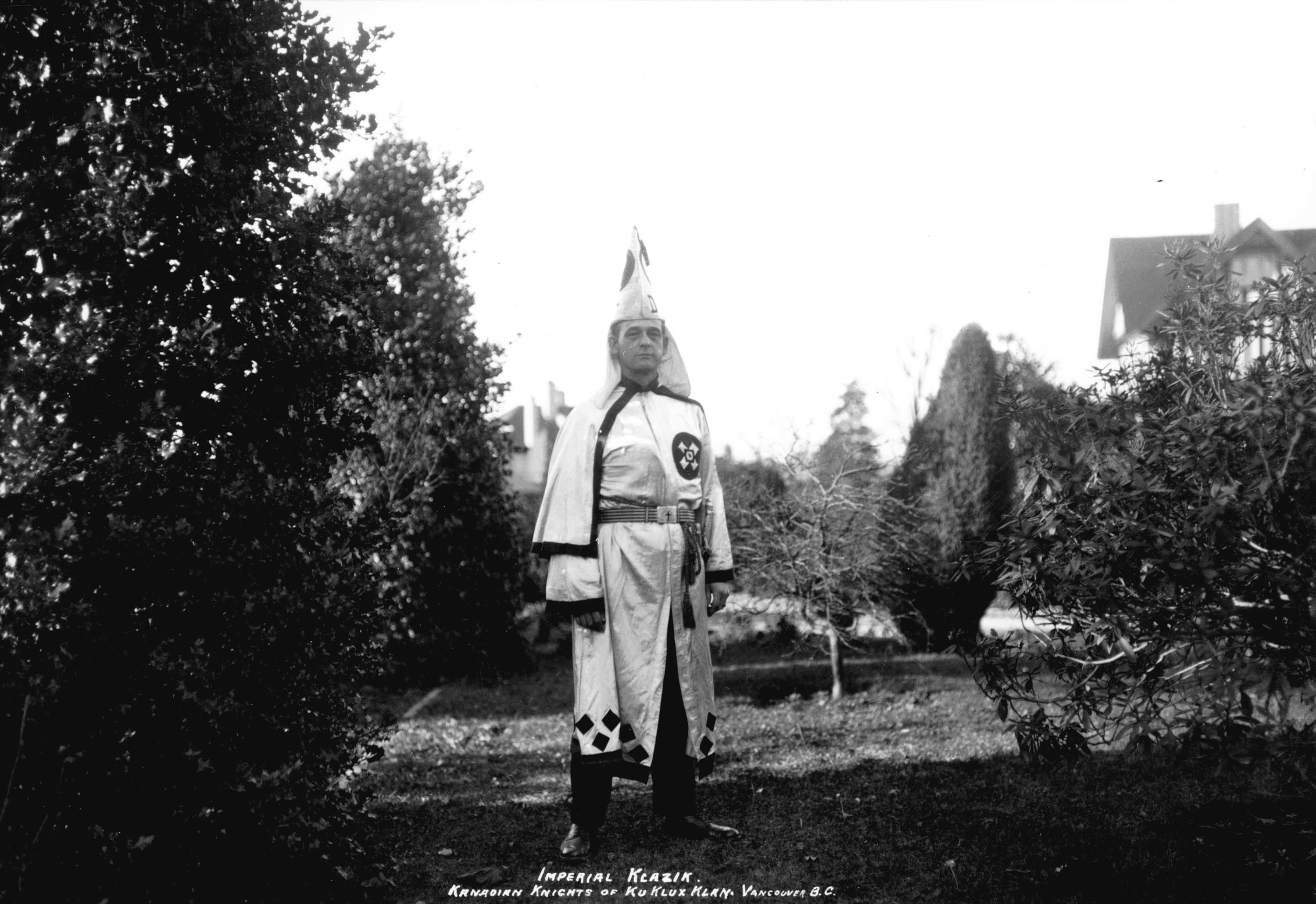
Imperial Klazik, British Columbia, 1925. The name is derived from Klan and Cazique.

Not all offices were reproduced at each level. The kladd, klarogo, klexter, and klokard were not present at the province level, and the kladd was not included on the realm level. The klazik, second vice-president, and klonsul, attorney, positions only existed at the imperial level. The klazik's duties included being head of the department of realms and organizing new realms and provinces. At the province level there were three klaliffs that served as an advisory board. A klokann of three members, each one named a klokan, filled this role at the local levels and a klokann of four members at the imperial level, in which they served as a "Supreme Board of Auditors and Special Advisers" and was led by a chief imperial klokan.

The imperial wizard's genii constituted his Imperial Kloncilium; this was the imperial wizard's supreme advisory board, as well as the Klans highest administrative organ in between Klonvokations. It met regularly every July, but could also be called when the imperial wizard or five geniis petitioned him to do so. The Kloncilium was also the Supreme Tribunal of Justice of the organization with appellate jurisdiction and the right to finally determine disputes between realms, provinces, klans and members in unorganized states

Giant was adopted as an emeritus title: Imperial Giant for a former imperial wizard, Grand Giant for a former grand dragon, Great Giant for a former great titan, and Klan Giant for a former exalted cyclops.

A Kleagle was a recruiter and was responsible for organizing local Klans.

== Post-1944 ==
Since the dissolution of Knights of the Ku Klux Klan, Inc. in 1944, there have been many Klan groups. Details of the nomenclature have varied, somewhat, among the different groups, but some terms have had more currency than others. Over time, the term klavern replaced klan for local groups. Imperial Wizard and Grand Dragon have still been generally used for the leader of a Klan organization and for state (realm) leaders. Exceptions included cases of one state Klans, such as the Association of Georgia Klans, whose leader, Samuel Green, kept the title Grand Dragon until shortly before his death. The White Knights of the Ku Klux Klan created some innovations in their organization including a bicameral Klongress with an upper house Klonvokation and lower Klanburgess.

In the late 1970s, David Duke's Knights of the Ku Klux Klan dropped the Imperial Wizard title; the leader was called national director. That organization, now known as the Knights Party, no longer uses most of the traditional Klan titles, and the only fraternal titles used are Page, Squire, and Knight for levels of membership.

== Vocabulary ==
Aside from titles and geographical designations, a distinctive vocabulary has grown around the Ku Klux Klan organizations. These include names for rituals, code words, and practices of the various Klans.

- Klankraft or Klanishness – the overall practice and state of being a Klan member. This could be defined as the employment and patronizing of fellow Klansmen, as well as sale of official Klan memorabilia, such as T-shirts, watches and belt buckles. Imperial Wizard Robert Shelton gave this definition: "robes, cross lightings and parades, the mysticism, everything that made the Klan the Klan". Other definitions included maintaining the sanctity of one's home, maintenance of white supremacy and purity, and loyalty to the Klan itself.

=== Membership ===
There are terms related to membership and non-membership:

- Alien – a non-member
- Naturalization – the Klan initiation ceremony
- Citizen – a Klan member
- Passport – membership card
- Banished – expelled from the Klan
- Yellow dog – a hazing ritual similar to the type used in college fraternities; when practiced by imperial officers, called the Royal Order of the Purple Dog.

=== Groups ===
Groups of Klansmen that were commissioned for "special activities":

- Wrecking Crew – an action squad commissioned to take physical action against enemies and wayward members of the Klan. Depending on time and organization, these groups consisted of five to eight members and were authorized either by the klokann, the Exalted Cyclops and/or the Kludd. Sometimes led by the Nighthawk. An action taken by the crew is wrecked. Some names used by wrecking crews include "Secret Six", "Ass-tear Squad" and "Holy terrors".
- Klan Bureau of Investigation – Pioneered by the Mississippi White Knights, these groups investigate the Klan's enemies and check leaks.
- Degree teams – a group which performs the task of initiation.

=== Finances ===
- Klectoken or Klecktokon – initiation fee. It stabilized around $10 before the 1970s.
- Imperial tax – membership dues
- Provincial tax – secondary dues, paid per capita for the upkeep of a Realm.

=== Code words and phrases ===
- A.Y.A.K. or Ayak – "Are you a Klansman?" to be answered with below.
- A.K.I.A. or Akia – "A Klansman I am"; these were code words for Klansmen meeting in strange surroundings. They would be inserted into common conversation, for instance "Does a Mr. Ayak live in this neighborhood?" to be responded by "No, but a Mr. Akia does." The password would then be accompanied by a secret handshake or other sign of recognition.
- K.I.G.Y or Kigy – "Klansman, I greet you"
- S.A.N.B.O.G. or Sanbog – "Strangers are near, be on guard"
- Itsub – "In the sacred unfailing bond", a correspondence sign-off
- Sor – "Sign of recognition"
- K.L.A.S.P. – "Klannish loyalty a sacred principle"
- C.A.B.A.R.K. – "Constantly Applied By All Real Klansmen"
- O.R.I.O.N – Our Race Is Our Nation.
- L.O.T.I.E or LOTIE – Lady Of The Invisible Empire. This was one of a number of names for Klan women's auxiliaries.

=== Dates and times ===
Two KKK codes for dates and times have been developed, the Ku Klux Register in the original prescripts and the Kalender developed by William J. Simmons.

==== Ku Klux Register ====
In the original prescripts the register contained twelve designations, thought to correspond to months:

- 1st – Dismal
- 2nd – Sassy
- 3rd – Fast
- 4th – Furious
- 5th – Portentous
- 6th – Wonderful
- 7th – Alarming
- 8th – Kool
- 9th – Melancholy
- 10th – Mournful
- 11th – Dying
- 12th – Fabulous

The second prescript had a slightly different scheme.

1. Dismal
2. Mystic
3. Stormy
4. Peculiar
5. Blooming
6. Brilliant
7. Painful
8. Portentous
9. Fading
10. Melancholy
11. Glorious
12. Gloomy

Colors were used for the days of the week:

- 1st Prescript
  1. White
  2. Green
  3. Blue
  4. Black
  5. Yellow
  6. Crimson
  7. Purple
- 2nd Prescript
  1. White
  2. Green
  3. Yellow
  4. Amber
  5. Purple
  6. Crimson
  7. Emerald

Twelve designations were used for the hours of the day:

- 1st prescript
  1. Fearful
  2. Startling
  3. Awful
  4. Woeful
  5. Horrid
  6. Bloody
  7. Doleful
  8. Sorrowful
  9. Hideous
  10. Frightful
  11. Appalling
  12. Last
- 2nd prescript
  1. Fearful
  2. Startling
  3. Wonderful
  4. Alarming
  5. Mournful
  6. Appalling
  7. Hideous
  8. Frightful
  9. Awful
  10. Horrible
  11. Dreadful
  12. Last

==== Kalender ====
The Kalender developed by W. J. Simmons included codes for days of the week, weeks, months and years. For months:

- January – Bloody
- February – Gloomy
- March – Hideous
- April – Fearful
- May – Furious
- June – Alarming
- July – Terrible
- August – Horrible
- September – Mournful
- October – Sorrowful
- November – Frightful
- December – Appalling

For weeks and days:

- Weeks
  1. Woeful
  2. Weeping
  3. Wailing
  4. Wonderful
  5. Weird
- Days
  1. Dark
  2. Deadly
  3. Dismal
  4. Doleful
  5. Desolate
  6. Dreadful
  7. Desperate

Years were reckoned according to reigns and cycles. The Reign of Incarnation and Incantation was all time up to the American Revolutionary War. The First Reign of our Incarnation and Incantation was the period between the Revolution and the establishment of the original Klan, which was reckoned to May 6, 1866, in this scheme. The Reign of our Second Incarnation and Incantation was reckoned between 1866 and Grand Wizard Nathan Bedford Forrest's dissolution of the Klan, which is reckoned to 1872. The Reign of our Third Incarnation and Incantation began in 1915. The Klan year, Anno Klanslar, began in May of each year, and the cycle was reckoned from December of each calendar year.
