= The Sins of the Father: A Romance of the South =

1912 novel by Thomas Dixon Jr.

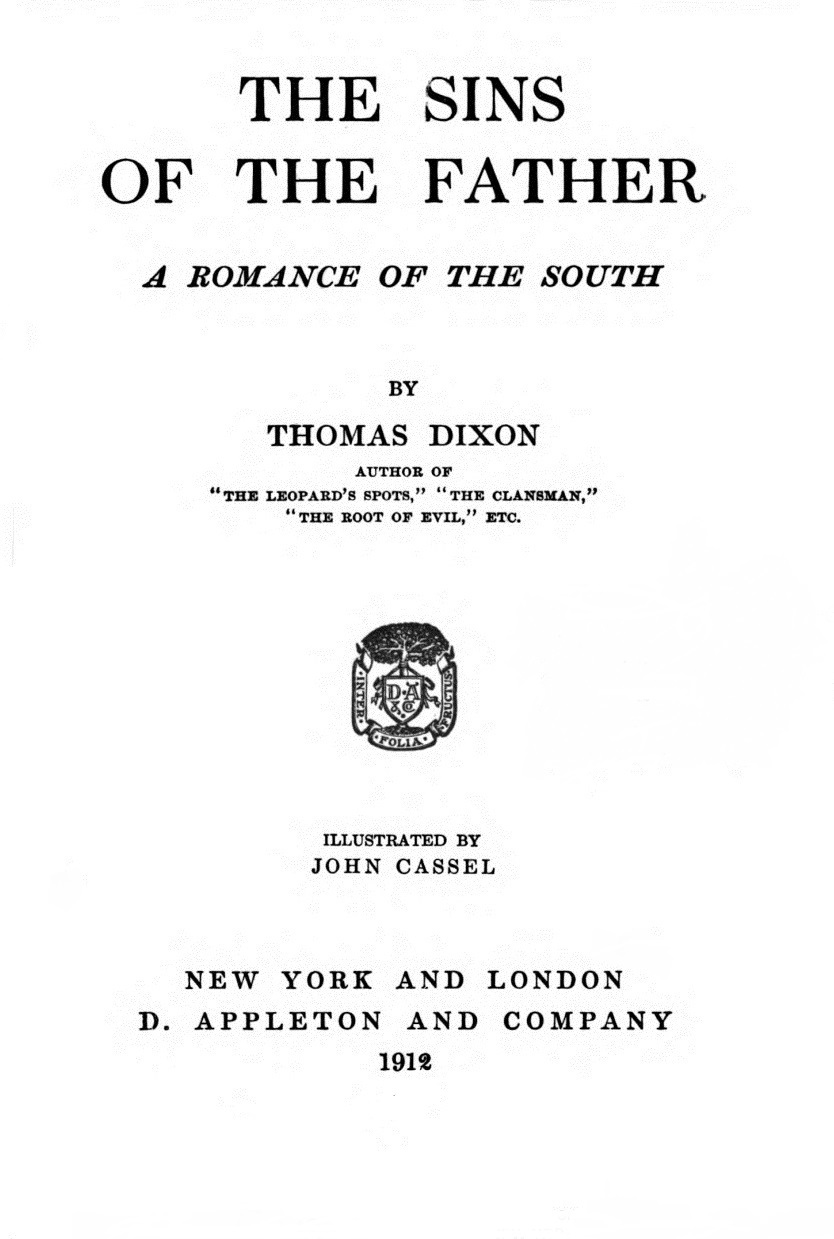
- Title page of the first edition.
- Authors: Thomas Dixon Jr.
- Language: English
- Publisher: D. Appleton and Co.
- Publication date: 1912
- Pages: 462

The Sins of the Father: A Romance of the South is a 1912 novel by Thomas Dixon Jr.

== Plot summary ==
Dan Norton, a Confederate veteran, Ku Klux Klan leader and newspaper publisher, hires a quadroon called Cleo Peeler as a caretaker for his son and his ailing wife, Jean Norton, a descendant of Southern planters. They sleep together and have a daughter, whom he sends to an orphanage. Shortly after, Cleo attempts to blackmail him to regain her position as caretaker.

Norton runs for office as a pro-segregation politician. Meanwhile, his son has a relationship with the octoroon daughter Norton had with Cleo. His wife Jean commits suicide. As he kills his son to put an end to the relationship, he also commits suicide.

== Main themes ==
The main theme is miscegenation, or in Dixon's words, it was a "study of race mixing". A second theme is the white male's sexual desire for the black woman. A consubstantial theme is "the need for complete racial separation."

The novel portrays the Wilmington massacre of 1898.

== Critical reception ==
Academic Joseph B. Keener has argued that Dixon "reverses the stereotyped figure of the tragic mulatto, making her the tyrannical aggressor and the cause of the South's degradation." Instead of being a "victim of white sexual exploitation," she becomes "the sexual aggressor."

According to Sandra Gunning, an assistant professor of English at the University of Michigan, the book may have been less successful than The Clansman or The Leopard's Spots because it was too fatalistic. She went on to characterize the plot as the "repetition of antebellum white traditions of breaking sexual and familial taboos." She added that Dixon was "forced to kill his hero to cleanze the novel's idealized white world." In contrast, she added that the other two aforementioned novels had provided "a more palatable fantasy of a white male rescue based on disciplining of unruly body."

== Theatrical performances ==
Dixon had first written a three-act play in 1909, which he turned into a novel published in 1912. The play was first performed on September 21, 1910, at the Academy of Music in Norfolk, Virginia. According to Dixon, after the lead actor was killed by a shark at Wrightsville Beach, off the coast of Wilmington, North Carolina, Dixon took over the role and acted in the play for a year. However, biographer Anthony Slide disagrees with this story, suggesting the lead actor was dismissed at the end of that month.
