= Her Boss =

Short story by Willa Cather

- Short story by Willa Cather
- Country: United States
- Language: English
- Genre: Short story

Publication
- Published in: The Smart Set
- Publication type: Literary magazine
- Publication date: October 1919

"Her Boss" is a short story by Willa Cather. It was first published in Smart Set in October 1919.

== Plot summary ==
Paul Wanning, a New York City lawyer, has been told he is terminally ill. His wife tries to belittle the news, and seems more interested in settling their daughters, who take dance lessons. Paul visits his son who lives in Washington Square and tells him he would like to see him get married before he dies. He then visits his friends by Astor Place, who suggest introducing him to their doctors, but they soon lose interest. In his office, he decides to write a letter to an old friend of his, and his copyist Annie Wooley types it for him. She cries upon hearing the content as her own father has passed.

The following Summer, the Wannings all go off on holiday - Roma goes to Genoa to visit her friend Jenny, Harold goes to Cornish, and Mrs Wanning and Florence go to York Harbor, where Mr Wanning is supposed to join them. However, he spends much of the summer in New York City, where he takes up Annie as his personal secretary. This makes his other partners and his stenographer talk, especially when he takes her out to dinner or to the theatre. The girl's father tells him he hopes her daughter is not misbehaving, and he explains she is only bringing him kindness in this distressful time.

In September, Paul dies. Alongside his will comes a letter to his wife, asking her to give $1000 to Miss Wooley. When Harold hears about that, he decides not to tell his mother and instead he fires the girl. Back with her family, they reflect that the rich cannot be battled with, especially when they are lawyers - Annie shall rest for a while.

== Characters ==
- Paul Wanning. He is sixty years old and works in a law firm close to Trinity Church.
- Mrs Julia Wanning. She is fifty-five years old.
- Sam, a black servant.
- Dr Seares
- Roma, the Wannings's elder daughter.
- Florence, the Wannings's younger daughter.
- Harold, the Wannings's son. He is a playwright and lives in Washington Square.
- Rickie Allen, a dance teacher.
- Mr Lane, an attorney.
- The Burtons
- Jenny Lane, a friend of Roma's. She has now married Count Aldrini and lives in Genoa.
- Count Aldrini
- Mr Rydberg
- Douglas Brown, an old friend of Paul Wanning's from college, who now lives by the Wind River Range in Wyoming.
- Miss Doane, Paul Wanning's stenographer.
- Annie Wooley, the copyist.
- Alec McQuiston, Paul Wanning's senior partner in his law firm.
- Wade, Paul Wanning's partner in his law firm.
- Willy Steen, the plumber's son.

== Allusions to other works ==
- There is a Venus de' Medici in the Wannings's house.
- Roma is compared to Theodora, Semiramis and Poppaea Sabina.
- Harold is said to look like Lord Byron.
- Harold's plays are sometimes compared to Anton Chekhov and Eugène Brieux.
- Annie Wooley is said to be reading Thomas Dixon's 1902 novel The Leopard's Spots.
