= Cross burning =

Antiquated practice now associated with the Ku Klux Klan

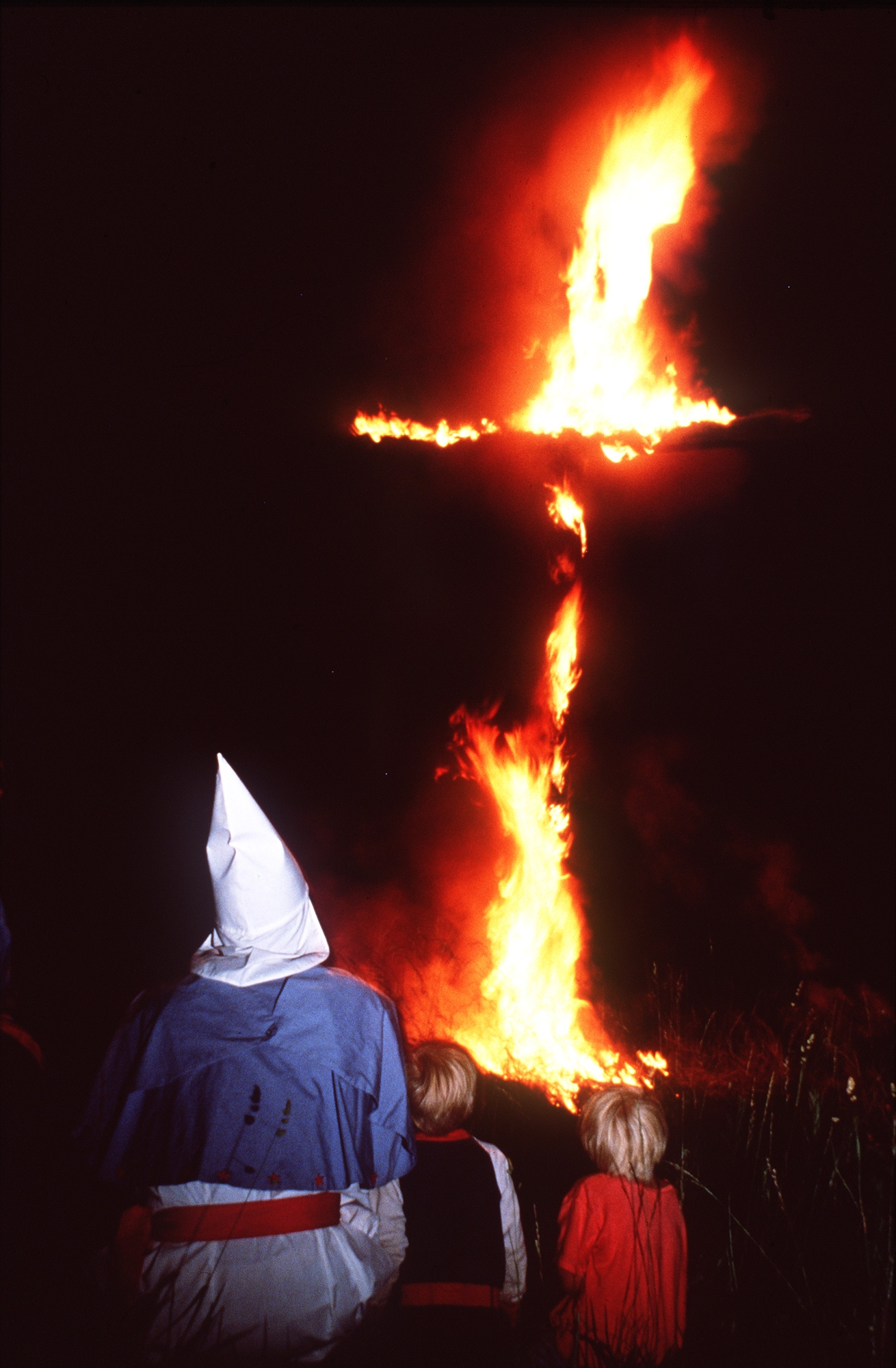
Cross burning during a Ku Klux Klan gathering in Oak Hill, Ohio in 1987

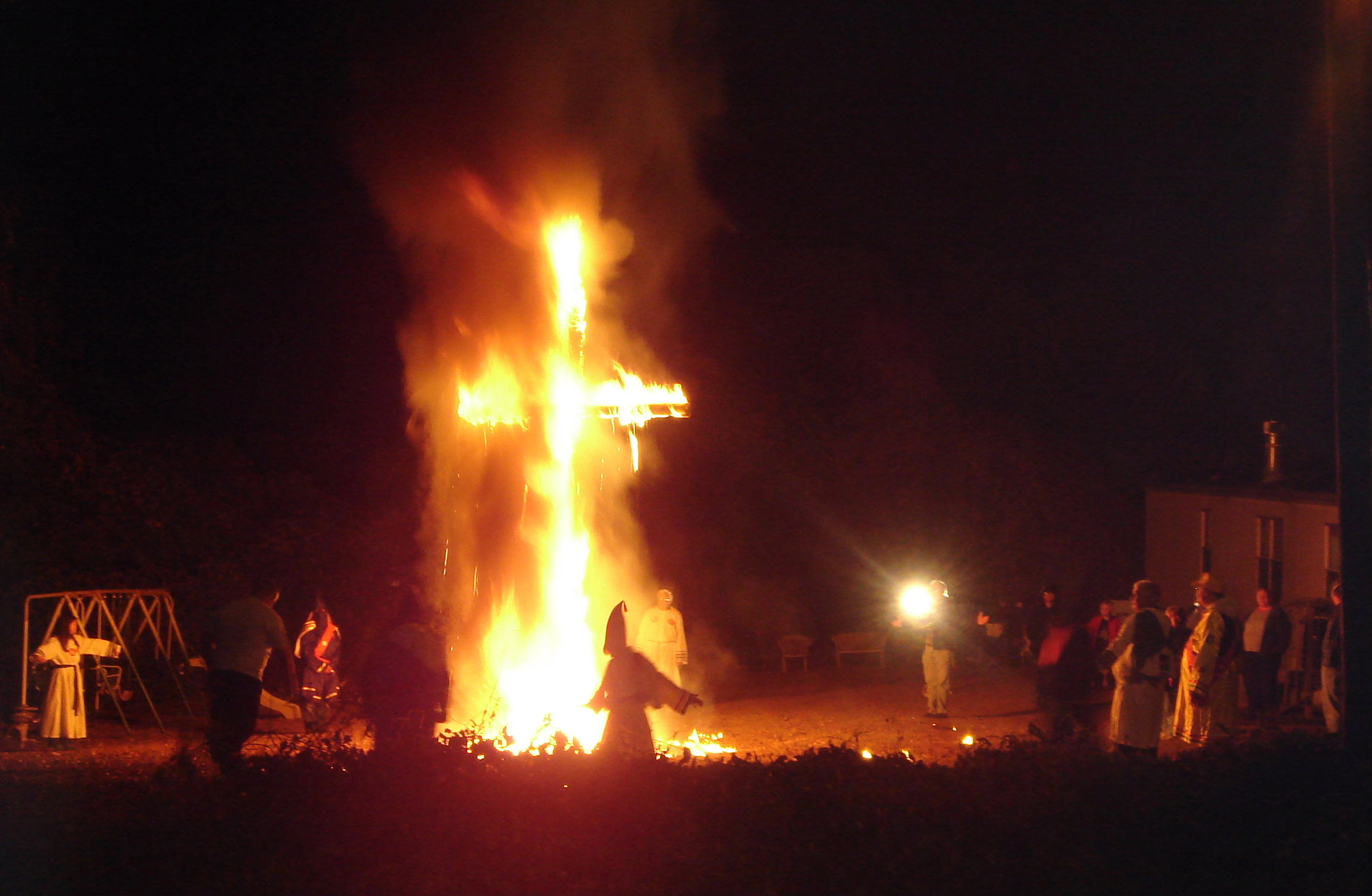
Ku Klux Klan members at a cross burning in 2005

In modern times, cross burning or cross lighting is a practice which is associated with the Ku Klux Klan. However, it was practiced long before the Klan's inception. Since the early 20th century, the Klan has burned crosses on hillsides as a way to intimidate and threaten Black Americans and other marginalized groups.

== Scottish origins ==
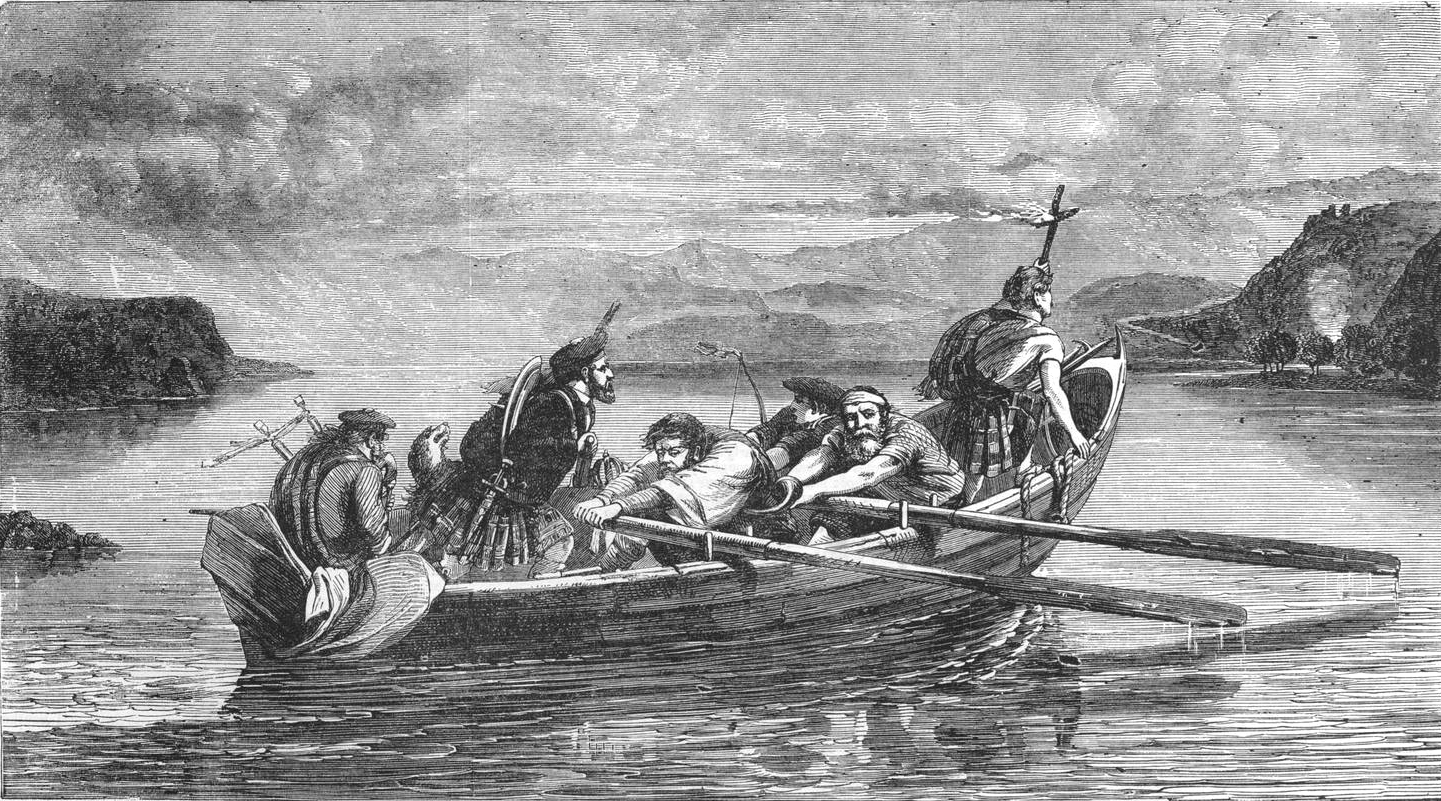
A Victorian depiction of the crann tara

In Scotland, the fiery cross, known as the crann-tara, was used as a declaration of war. The sight of it commanded all clan members to rally to the defence of the area. On other occasions, a small burning cross would be carried from town to town. During the War of 1812, burning crosses were used to mobilize the Canadian Militia's Glengarry Light Infantry when American forces invaded Canada. In 1820, over 800 fighting men of Clan Grant were gathered, by the passing of the fiery cross, to come to the aid of their Clan Chieftain and his sister in the town of Elgin, Scotland. In Scotland itself, the last significant use of the burning cross was made in 1745, during the Jacobite rising, and it was subsequently described in the novels and poetry of Sir Walter Scott, particularly The Lady of the Lake of 1810.

== Ku Klux Klan symbol origins ==
In the first era, Reconstruction Klans did not burn crosses. The belief that reconstruction Klans burned crosses was introduced by Thomas Dixon Jr., in his novel The Clansman: A Historical Romance of the Ku Klux Klan (1905). A cross burning is first described in Book IV Chapter 2 "The Fiery Cross" on pages 324–326 of the 1905 edition. It is introduced by one of the characters as "the old Scottish rite of the burning cross. It will send a thrill of inspiration to every clansmen in the hills." It is further elaborated that

In olden times when the Chieftain of our people summoned the clan on an errand of life and death, the Fiery Cross, extinguished in sacrificial blood, was sent by swift courier from village to village. This call was never made in vain, nor will it be to-night in the new world. Here, on this spot made holy ground by the blood of those we hold dearer than life, I raise the ancient symbol of an unconquered race of men—

This scene is accompanied by an unnumbered plate illustration by Arthur I. Keller, captioned "'The fiery cross of old Scotland's hills'", showing two robed, unmasked Klansmen, one of whom is holding a lighted cross, over a bound, blindfolded and gagged Black American, while robed and hooded klansmen look on. The novel ends with a Klansman waiting for election results stating "Look at our lights on the mountains! They are ablaze - range on range our signals gleam until the Fiery Cross is lost among the stars" meaning that he had won and civilization had been saved in the South. The fiery cross is mentioned once again in the final novel of Dixon's Klan trilogy, The Traitor: A Story of the Fall of the Invisible Empire, when a Grand Dragon tosses a burning cross on a heap of discarded Klan robes and regalia in obedience to the order of the Grand Dragon to dissolve the order. This scene is accompanied by an illustration captioned "Some of the men were sobbing" by Charles David Williams featuring a gathering of Klansmen over a burning pile of robes, carrying three burning crosses.

=== The Birth of a Nation ===
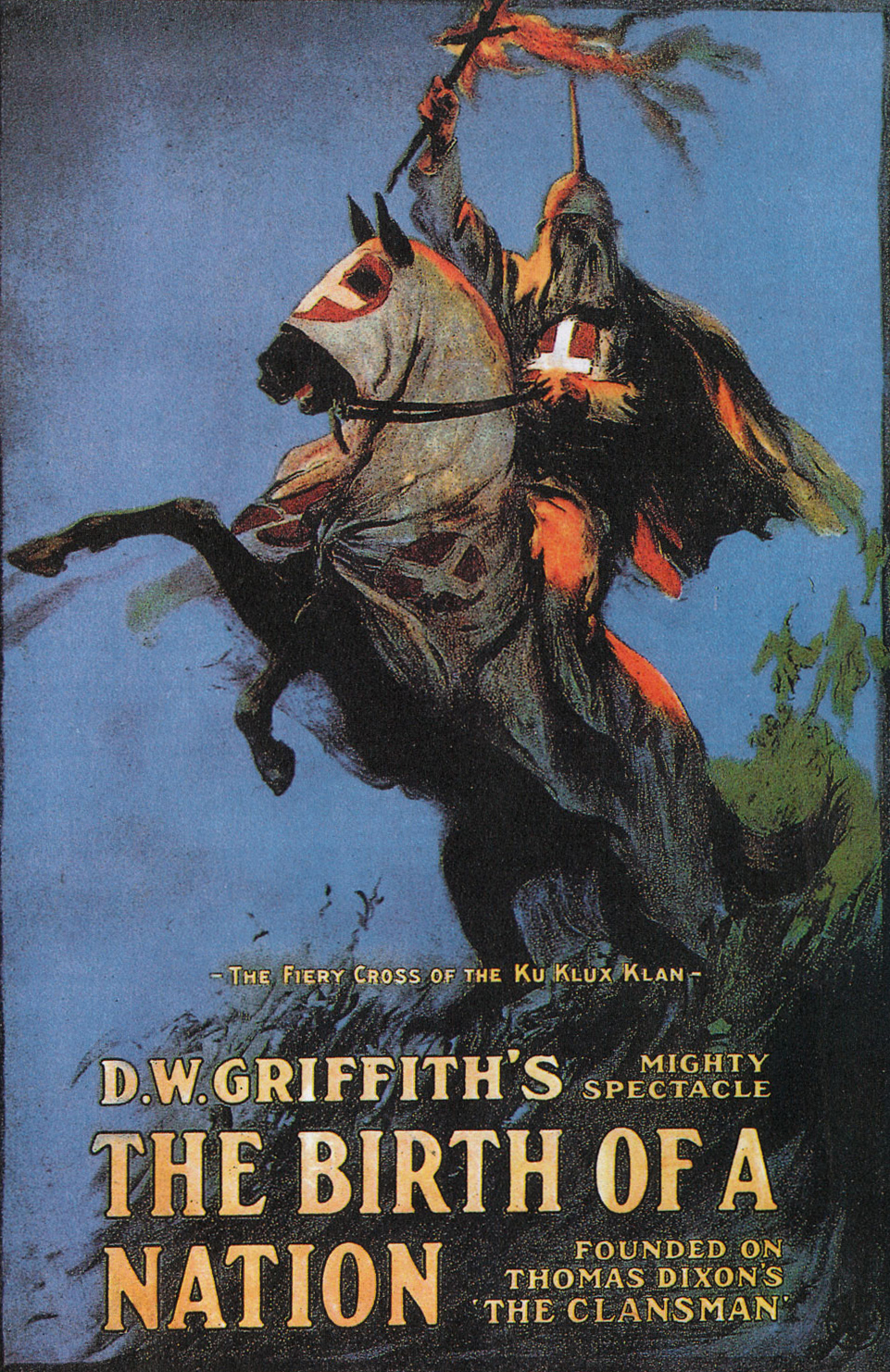
The poster of The Birth of a Nation which features a Klansman holding a burning cross while on a horse

In D.W. Griffith's film The Birth of a Nation (1915), an adaptation of Thomas Dixon's novel, The Clansman, two sequences depict cross-burnings.

The first sequence depicts a Confederate colonel's little sister, who rejects a marriage proposal by a Black captain (of the occupying Union force) and dies after he chases her (the Piedmont, South Carolina legislature had legalized interracial marriages, and the story imagines the social chaos that whites feared would develop). The few members of the local clan later burn a small cross drenched in the young girl's blood. A kangaroo court is convened, hears the girl's dying words when the colonel gives his testimony, finds the captain guilty of murder, and executes him. The clan members place his body on the front porch of the South Carolina governor's mansion with a square piece of white sheeting with the initials KKK.

The second sequence depicts the aftermath of two home invasions. The clan wishes to intervene but it is prevented from doing so by the occupying Union troops. A colonel requests help by burning a cross in the daytime; the black smoke which is produced by the burning cross signals clans from neighboring counties to come to their aid and contest the Union military's control of the town.

== Occurrences ==
=== United States ===
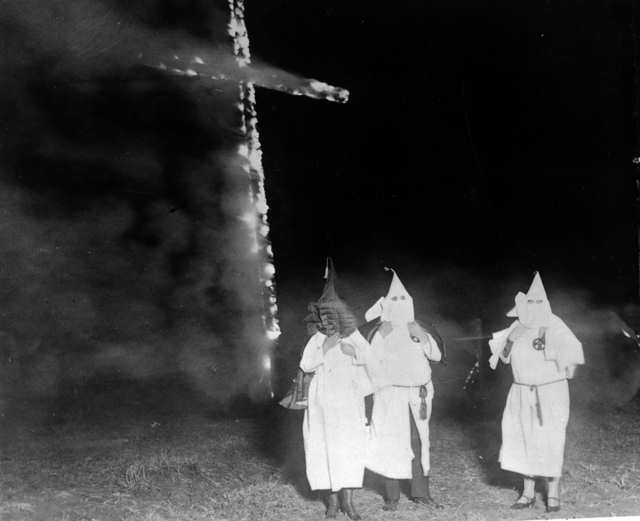
Ku Klux Klan members conduct a cross burning in 1921.

In the United States, the first recorded cross burning occurred on November 25, 1915, ten months after the debut of The Birth of a Nation, when a group of men led by William J. Simmons burned a cross atop Stone Mountain, Georgia, inaugurating the revival of the Ku Klux Klan. The event was attended by 15 charter members and a few aging former members of the original Klan.

According to journalist and civil rights advocate Carey McWilliams, in California during the '30s, several crosses were burned as part of the intimidation practices of the vigilante groups which were organized to break off pickers' strikes by the Associated Farmers.

Crosses were burned during the Tallahassee bus boycott of 1956.

=== France ===
Croix-de-Feu (French: [kʁwa də fø], Cross of Fire) was a nationalist French league of the interwar period.

== Legal position in the United States ==
In 2003, the Supreme Court of the United States invoked a stage adaptation of Sir Walter Scott's The Lady of the Lake in its Virginia v. Black decision as an example of a display of cross burning that was not intended "to intimidate a person or group of persons" when they struck down a Virginia statute that included the language "Any such burning of a cross shall be prima facie evidence of an intent to intimidate a person or group of persons" because it presumes that the "intent [is] to intimidate."

== See also ==
- List of symbols designated by the Anti-Defamation League as hate symbols
- Lewes Bonfire
