= Leroy McAfee =

American politician

- Born: December 17, 1837; North Carolina, U.S.
- Died: 1873 (aged 35–36); York, South Carolina
- Resting place: Methodist church, York, South Carolina
- Education: University of North Carolina
- Occupations: Lawyer, politician
- Known for: Ku Klux Klan leadership
- Spouses: Hattie Cameron; Agnes Adelaide Williams
- Relatives: Thomas Dixon, Jr. (nephew)

Leroy Magnum McAfee (1837 – 1873) was an American Confederate veteran and politician. He was a member of the North Carolina House of Representatives. He later served as the inspiration for the protagonist of his nephew Thomas Dixon Jr.'s infamous 1905 play The Clansman: A Historical Romance of the Ku Klux Klan and its 1915 film adaptation The Birth of a Nation.

== Early life ==
Leroy Magnum McAfee was born on December 17, 1837, in North Carolina. He graduated with first honors from the University of North Carolina in 1859; President James Buchanan was the featured speaker at the graduation.

== Career ==
McAfee worked as an attorney in Shelby, North Carolina.

During the American Civil War of 1861-1865, McAfee served as an officer in the Confederate States Army. He was commissioned as a Major on April 12, 1862, in the 49th North Carolina Infantry. He was promoted to the rank of Colonel on November 1, 1862.

McAfee served as a member of the North Carolina House of Representatives from 1870 to 1873, representing Cleveland County, North Carolina. He was a member of the Ku Klux Klan. According to his nephew Dixon, McAfee helped impeach Governor William Woods Holden.

== Personal life, death and legacy ==
McAfee was married twice. His first wife was Hattie Cameron and his second wife, Agnes Adelaide Williams.

McAfee's nephew, Thomas Dixon, Jr., dedicated his historical novel, The Clansman, "to the memory of a Scotch-Irish leader of the South, my uncle, Colonel Leroy McAfee, Grand Titan of the invisible Empire of the Ku Klux Klan."

McAfee died in 1873 of tuberculosis ("consumption"), and he was buried in Rose Hill Cemetery in York, South Carolina. In 1916, his nephew Dixon planned to erect a statue of McAfee on the courthouse square of Shelby, North Carolina. The project was initially met with enthusiasm, until it was announced that Dixon wanted McAfee to wear a Ku Klux Klan mask in the statue. Despite the controversy several Southern newspapers as well as The New York Times issued editorials in favor of the statue.
