= The Flaming Sword (novel) =

1939 novel by Thomas Dixon, Jr.

- Authors: Thomas Dixon Jr.
- Illustrator: Edward Shenton
- Language: English
- Publisher: Monarch Publishing
- Publication date: 1939

The Flaming Sword was a 1939 novel by Thomas Dixon Jr. It was his twenty-eighth and last novel. It has been described as "a racist jeremiad centered on the specter of black sexuality."

== Background ==
The novel is the last installment of a trilogy which included The Clansman and The Birth of a Nation. It is partly based on The Red Dawn, a play written by Dixon in 1919.

Dixon worked sixteen hours a day on this novel. The book came with thirty pages of illustrations done by Edward Shenton. It was published by Monarch Publishing, owned by Edward Young Clarke, a Ku Klux Klan member.

The title is taken from a quotation by African-American leader W.E.B. Du Bois: "Across this path stands the South with flaming sword."

== Plot summary ==
Shortly after Angela Cameron gets married, an African-American man breaks into her house, kills her husband and son, and rapes her sister. As a result, she decides to move to New York City and learn more about the situation of African-Americans. Meanwhile, African-Americans and Communists try to overthrow the government, and they succeed: the country becomes known as the 'Soviet Republic of the United States' and the only newspaper available in New York City is the Soviet Herald. However, she meets her childhood sweetheart and decides everything is not lost. Eventually, she donates US$10 million to found the Marcus Garvey Colonization Society, whose aim is to repatriate African Americans to the African continent.

== Critical reception ==
The book was reprinted four times in the first two months of publication. In 2005, it was reprinted by the University Press of Kentucky.

According to biographer Anthony Slide, the novel "is generally seen as a critical failure." Indeed, The New York Times called it "a nightmare melodrama" and "the expression of a panic fear." Alluding to World War II, the New York Herald Tribune suggested, "it is not as wildly incredible today as it might have seemed a few short weeks ago."

The novel was praised by Marcus Garvey.
