= The Traitor (Dixon novel) =

1907 novel by Thomas Dixon Jr

The Traitor: A Story of the Fall of the Invisible Empire
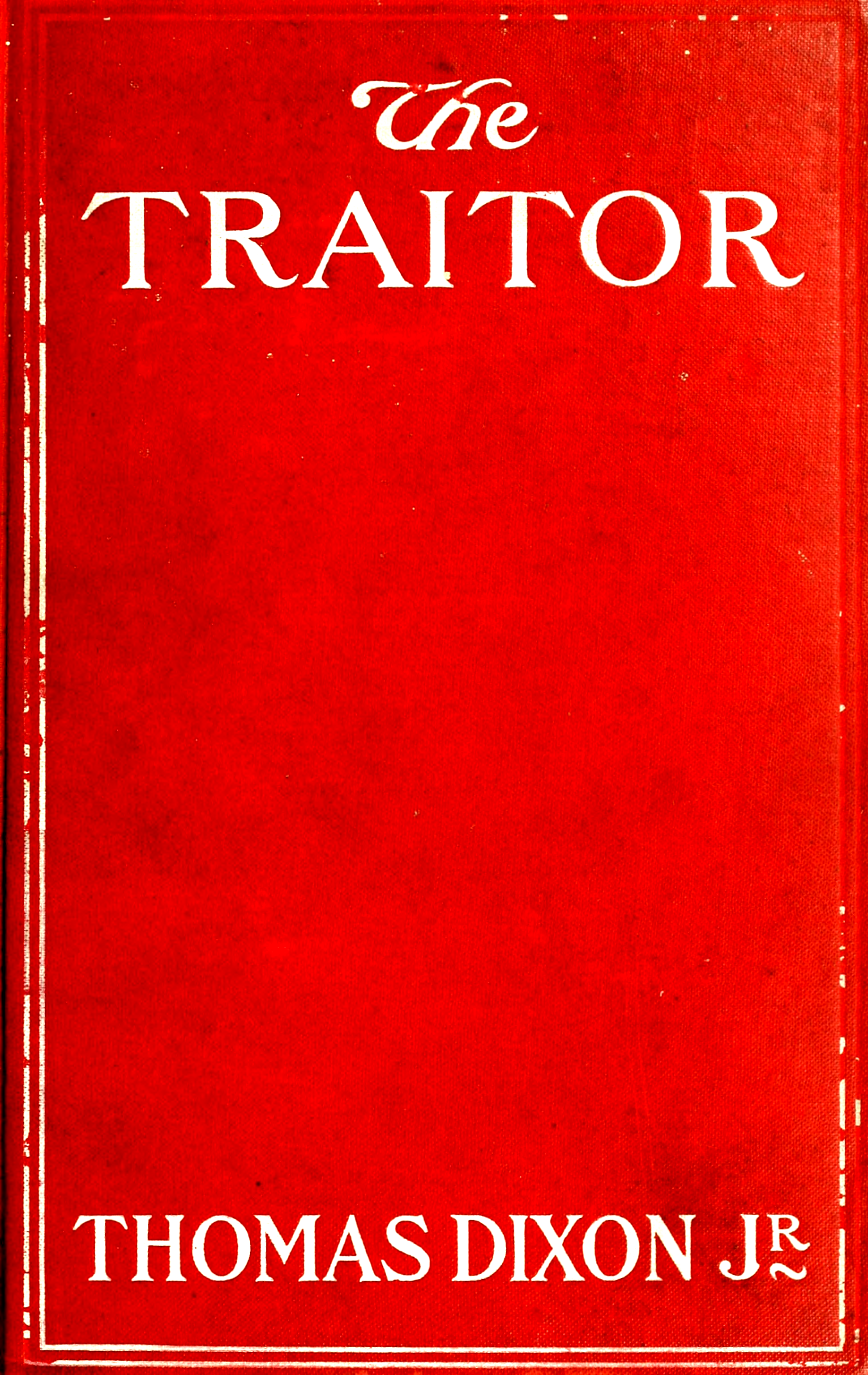
- Cover of the first edition of The Traitor.
- Authors: Thomas Dixon Jr.
- Language: English
- Publisher: Doubleday, Page
- Publication date: 1907
- Pages: 331

The Traitor: A Story of the Fall of the Invisible Empire is a 1907 novel by American writer Thomas Dixon Jr. It is the third part in a trilogy about the Ku Klux Klan during Reconstruction. The two previous installments were The Leopard's Spots, published in 1902, and The Clansman: An Historical Romance of the Ku Klux Klan, published in 1905.

== Plot summary ==
John Graham, a Confederate veteran and dispossessed planter, serves as the Grand Dragon of the Ku Klux Klan in North Carolina. As black power has been curtailed, the Grand Wizard orders Graham to have one last march through town and finally discontinue their activities. (This was ordered by the Klan's first Grand Wizard, Nathan Bedford Forrest.) The Klan members burn their robes and bury them in a grave. Two weeks later Graham's rival, Steve Hoyle, starts a new Ku Klux Klan.

== Dramatization ==
A dramatic version was produced in 1908. It was written in collaboration with Channing Pollock, whose name got first billing over that of Dixon.

== Critical reception ==
Judith Jackson Fossett, an African-American Associate Professor of English, American Studies, and Ethnicity at the University of Southern California, has called the novel "a meditation on whiteness, a contest between the 'good' Klan and the 'bad' Klan." Indeed, this interpretation was echoed by Dixon himself, who viewed the original Ku Klu Klan as indispensable to fight back against black "barbarism" during Reconstruction as opposed to the second Klan, which was more vengeful and violent. She added that the scene where the original Klan members burn and bury their robes is reminiscent of scenes of burials in Edgar Allan Poe's fiction. Moreover, she suggested it paralleled the natural shedding of skin by snakes.

Andrew Warnes, a Reader in American Studies at Leeds University in England, suggested the depictions of the mob mentality of the Ku Klux Klan in Richard Wright's novels were influenced by The Traitor.
