= 49th North Carolina Infantry Regiment =

Infantry regiment of the Confederate States Army

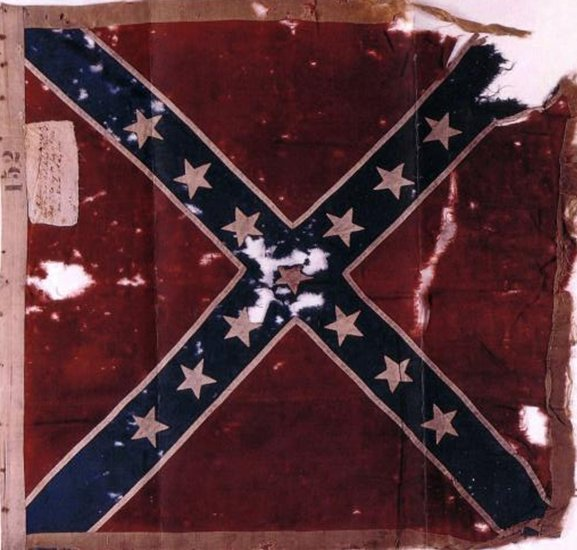
- Battle Flag of the 49th North Carolina Troops, captured at the Battle of the Crater
- Active: March 1862 to April 19, 1865
- Country: Confederate States of America
- Allegiance: North Carolina
- Branch: Confederate States Army
- Type: Infantry
- Engagements: Seven Days Battles Battle of Oak Grove Battle of Malvern Hill Maryland Campaign Battle of Harpers Ferry Battle of Antietam Battle of Fredericksburg Bermuda Hundred Campaign Battle of Chester Station Battle of Proctor's Creek Battle of Ware Bottom Church Siege of Petersburg First Battle of Petersburg Second Battle of Petersburg Battle of the Crater Battle of Globe Tavern Battle of Fort Stedman Appomattox Campaign Battle of Dinwiddie Court House Battle of Five Forks Battle of Appomattox Court House

The 49th North Carolina Infantry Regiment was a Confederate States Army regiment during the American Civil War attached to the Army of Northern Virginia.

== Organization and Training ==
The companies of the 49th North Carolina Infantry Regiment were recruited in the following counties:

Company A - McDowell and Rutherford counties
Company B - Cleveland and Davidson counties
Company C - Rowan County
Company D - Moore County
Company E - Iredell County
Company F - Mecklenburg County
Company G - Cleveland County
Company H - Gaston County
Company I - Catawba County
Company K - Lincoln and Gaston counties

Many of the recruits were members that had enlisted earlier in the war, but for lack of weapons were not able to be mustered into service. The companies were organized in their home counties and made their way to Camp Mangum in Raleigh, where they were organized as the 49th North Carolina Infantry Regiment. While at Camp Mangum the regimental officers were elected with Stephen Dodson Ramseur as colonel.

== Campaign Actions ==
After training, the unit was transferred to Richmond, Virginia, where they were placed in Major General Robert Ransom, Jr.'s brigade. While here they participated in the Seven Days Battles, with Col. Ramseur being wounded in the arm at the Battle of Malvern Hill. After his recovery he would be promoted to brigadier general and assigned elsewhere. LeRoy McAfee assumed command of the 49th NCT, being promoted to full colonel on 1, November 1862, and held that post until the army's surrender at Appomattox. The 49th fought under General Robert E. Lee as part of the Army of Northern Virginia throughout the Peninsula Campaign. They participated in the capture of Harper's Ferry, Virginia, and then were force marched to Sharpsburg, Maryland, for the Battle of Antietam.

After their arrival in Sharpsburg the 49th was posted in reserve near Burnside's Bridge. After some time resting they were ordered to support the attack at the west woods. There they pushed the Union troops out of the woods until they were halted at the edge of the cornfield. They remained in this position, under almost constant artillery shelling, for the rest of the day and into the night.

Afterward the army fell back and took up position near Fredericksburg, Virginia. The 49th participated in the battle there being posted on Marye's Heights. Shortly after the battle General Ransom's Brigade was recalled to eastern North Carolina. The 49th served in the New Bern area and near the Chowan River in North Carolina with the purpose of protecting the Petersburg / Weldon / Wilmington railroad. During this time they fought frequent skirmishes with Union cavalry forces attempting to raid the railroad.

Returning to Virginia, the unit participated in several battles as part of the Bermuda Hundred Campaign, eventually taking their place in the Petersburg line on the Confederate left just south of the James River.

On 30 July 1864, the Union army exploded thousands of pounds of gunpowder they had placed into a mine dug under the Confederate position. Ransom's brigade was at this time being commanded by Colonel McAfee. The 49th was posted close by and was rushed to the crater to help hold off the assault by the Union troops. They took up a position on the left of the crater with their lines at an angle fronting the Confederate breastworks and the crater. They played a conspicuous part in repelling the assault and ensuring that the Army of Northern Virginia was not cut in half. It was during the fighting here that the unit's flag was captured by Union troops. This flag is now in the archives of the Museum of the Confederacy in Richmond, awaiting funding for restoration.

After the Battle of the Crater it was determined by General Lee to attempt to break out of the siege. The 49 NCT was part of this attack and hit the Union line at Fort Stedman. The 49th was one of the units that made it into and occupied the fort until they were compelled to retreat to their own lines by the Union counterattack.

On 9 April 1865, General Robert E. Lee ordered a retreat. During the retreat the 49th was surrounded, and many were captured or scattered at the Battle of Five Forks. According to government records, 11 officers and 95 men from the 49th NCT eventually registered on the parole records at Appomattox.

== Commanding officers ==
- Colonel

Stephen D. Ramseur (promoted)
LeRoy (Lee) M. McAfee

- Lieutenant colonel

William A. Eliason (resigned)
LeRoy (Lee) M. McAfee (promoted)
John A. Flemming (killed 30, July 1864)
James T. David

- Major

LeRoy (Lee) M. McAfee (promoted)
John A. Flemming (promoted)
Pinckney B. Chambers (resigned)
James T. Davis (promoted)
Charles Quinn Petty

== Casualties ==
The 49 NCT lost the following casualties during the war:

- Wounded: 134
- Killed or died of wounds: 76
- Captured or prisoner: 24
- Died: 160

According to government records it surrendered 11 officers and 95 men on April 9, 1865.

== The "Modern" 49th North Carolina Infantry ==
The 49th North Carolina Infantry is portrayed by the Southern Piedmont Historical Reenactment Society based in central North Carolina. The group portrays both the 49th NC and the 21st Massachusetts Volunteer Infantry. They participate in battle reenactments and living history demonstrations throughout the eastern United States.

== See also ==
- List of North Carolina Confederate Civil War units
