= Arthur I. Keller =

American painter and illustrator (1867–1924)

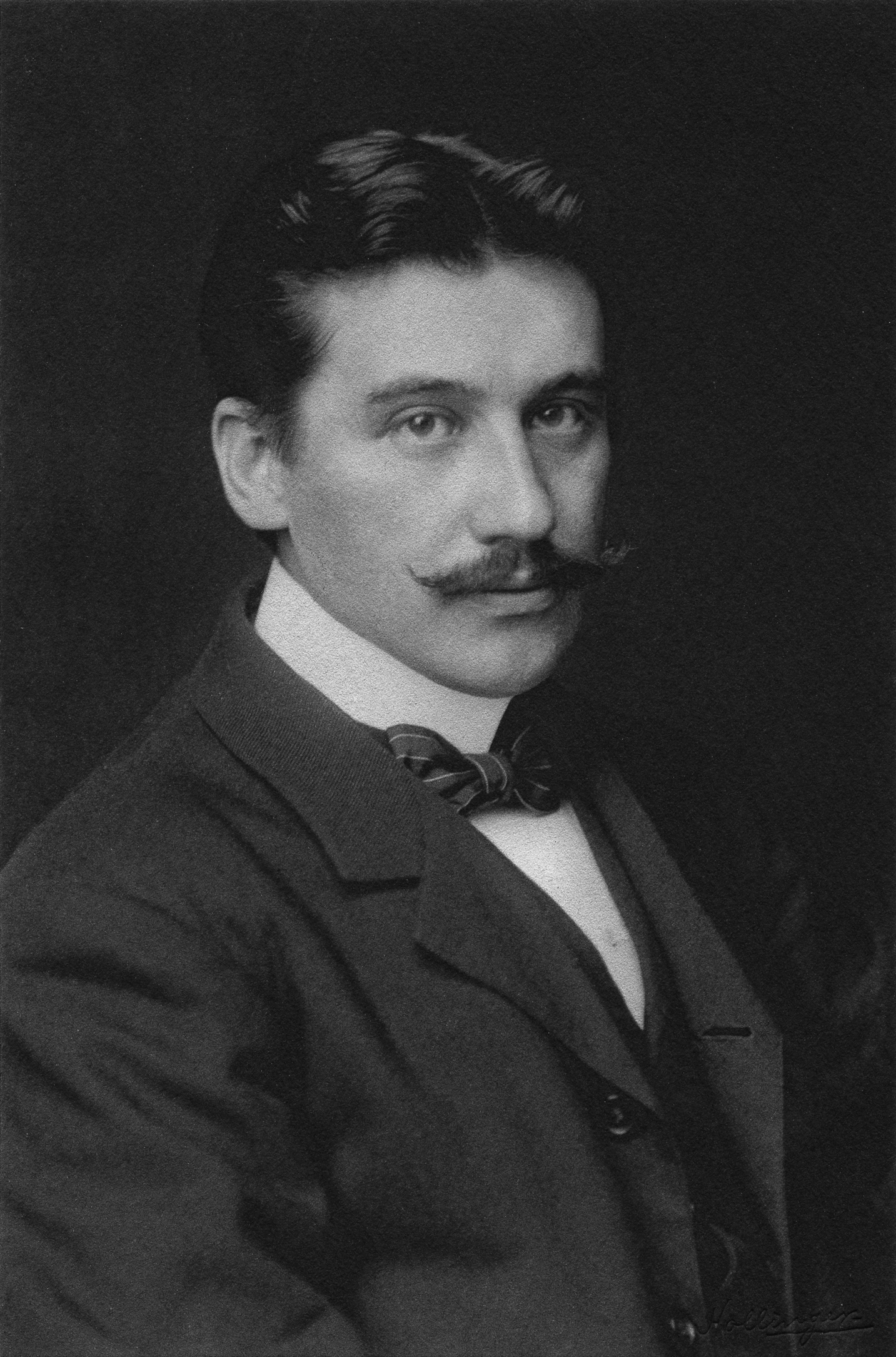
Keller in c. 1886

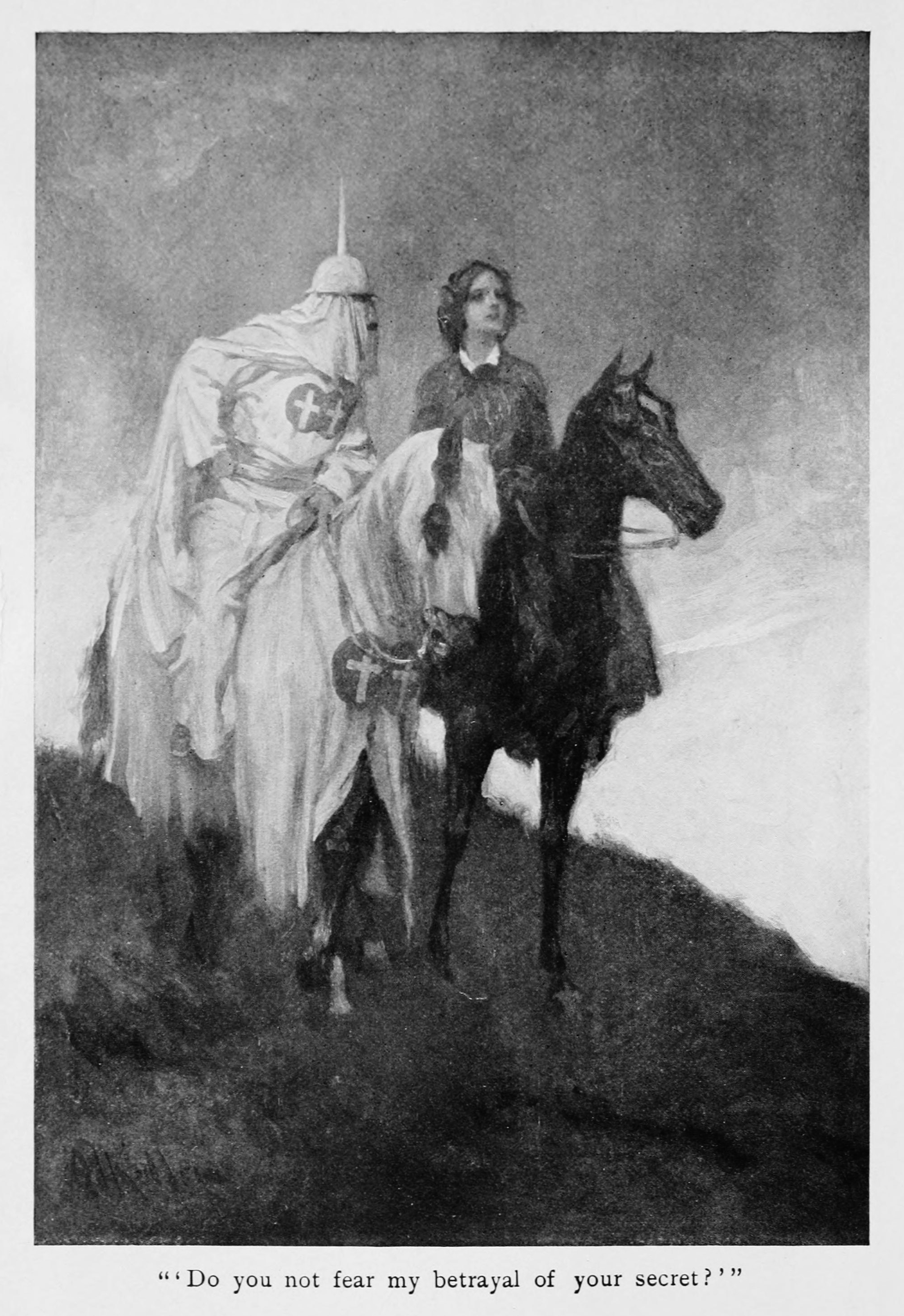
Keller's illustration for frontispiece to Thomas Dixon's book The Clansman

Arthur Ignatius Keller (July 4, 1867 – December 2, 1924) was an American painter and illustrator. His parents were Adam and Amanda Spohr Keller. He took up drawing at the National Academy, New York as a student of Professor Wilmarth. In Munich, he studied painting with Professor Loeffts. Keller worked in oil and watercolor. He won awards including the First Class Medal at the National Academy, Hallgarten composition prize, the Philadelphia Art Club gold medal, Paris Exposition of 1900 silver medal. Two years later he won the Evans water color prize. At the St. Louis Exposition of 1904 he won gold and silver medals. In San Francisco he was awarded the gold medal of the Panama Pacific International Exposition. At that point he turned almost exclusively to being an illustrator for the New York Herald.

Keller eventually gave up work for newspapers and magazines to provide book illustrations for authors such as F. Hopkinson Smith, Thomas Dixon, Kathleen Norris, Dr. S. Weir Mitchell, and Jeffrey Farnol. He illustrated A Christmas Carol (Dickens), (The Virginian (Wister), Kate Bonnet (Stockton), The Right of Way (Gilbert Parker), and the stories of Bret Harte. He won many medals for paintings and some of his oil and water-color productions were acquired by prominent galleries around the world.

His work with Dixon providing illustrations for The Clansman have been cited as inspiration for the uniforms of the Ku Klux Klan. The originals of the illustrations are in the Thomas Frederick Dixon Jr., Collection, John R. Dover Memorial Library, at Gardner-Webb University. Arthur Schomburg was among the first to recognize a resemblance between Ku Klux Klan uniforms and the capirote worn by the Brotherhood of Seville. Keller died from pneumonia after a walk on Thanksgiving.
