= The Root of Evil =

Book by Thomas Dixon

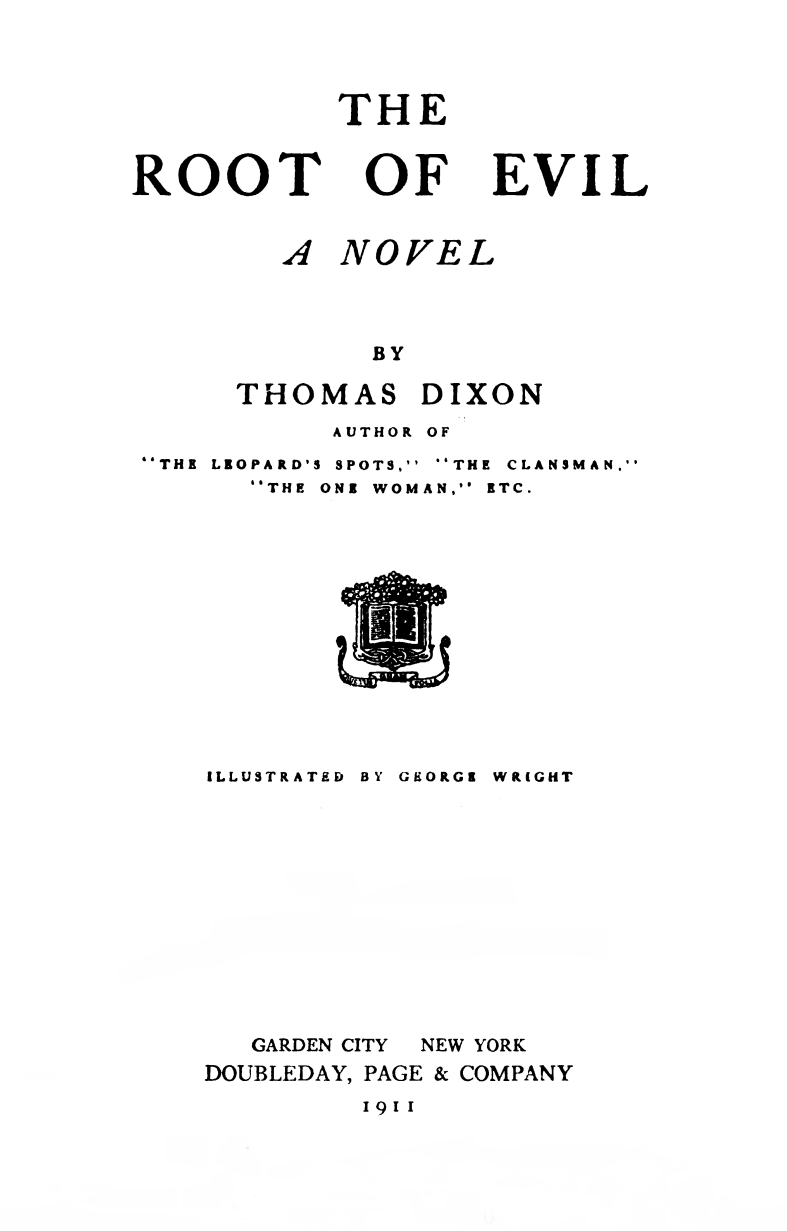
- Title page of the first edition.
- Authors: Thomas Dixon Jr.
- Language: English
- Publisher: Doubleday, Page & company
- Publication date: 1911
- Pages: 407

The Root of Evil is a 1911 novel by Thomas Dixon Jr.

== Plot summary ==
James Stuart, a Southerner, becomes a successful attorney in New York City. Meanwhile, Nan Primrose, his childhood lover marries his college friend, John C. Calhoun Bivens, now a millionnaire lawyer. At the same time, Dr Henry Woodman takes care of the poor in New York, and opposes the takeover of a drug company by Bivens. Stuart eventually marries his daughter. When Woodman steals some jewelry from Bivens, he goes through a trial but is acquitted by the judges thanks to his good deeds.

== Main theme ==
Biographer Anthony Slide viewed the book as an 'attack on capitalism.'

== Critical reception ==
Slide called it 'a novel for today and for all ages.' It has also been called 'a novel with a purpose'
