= Stephen Dodson Ramseur =

Confederate Army general (1837–1864)

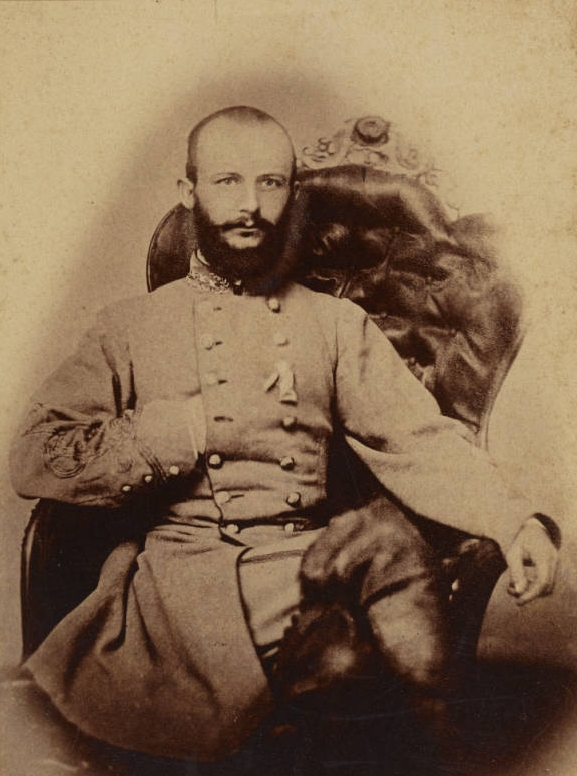
- Born: May 31, 1837; Lincolnton, North Carolina, U.S.
- Died: October 20, 1864 (aged 27); Belle Grove Plantation, Middletown, Virginia, U.S.
- Burial place: Saint Luke's Episcopal Church Cemetery Lincolnton, North Carolina
- Relatives: Ellen "Nellie" Richmond (Wife); Mary Dodson Ramseur (Daughter)
- Military career
- Allegiance: United States of America; Confederate States of America
- Branch: United States Army; Confederate States Army
- Service years: 1860–1861 (USA); 1861–1864 (CSA)
- Rank: Second Lieutenant (USA); Major General (CSA)
- Nicknames: Dod; Dodson Ramseur
- Units: 3rd U.S. Artillery; 4th U.S. Artillery; 3rd North Carolina Infantry; 1st North Carolina Artillery
- Commands: 49th North Carolina Infantry; Ramseur's Brigade, II Corps, Army of Northern Virginia; Early's Division, II Corps, Army of Northern Virginia
- Conflicts: American Civil War: Seven Days Battles; Battle of Malvern Hill; Battle of Chancellorsville; Battle of Gettysburg; Battle of the Wilderness; Battle of Spotsylvania Court House; Battle of Cold Harbor; Battle of Opequon; Battle of Cedar Creek †

Stephen Dodson Ramseur (May 31, 1837 – October 20, 1864) was a Confederate general in the American Civil War, at one point the youngest in the army. He impressed Lee by his actions at Malvern Hill and Chancellorsville, where his brigade led Stonewall Jackson’s flank attack, taking 50% casualties. On the first day of Gettysburg, he dramatically routed a Union brigade, sending it running through the town, though his superiors did not authorize further pursuit. Ramseur also distinguished himself in the Overland campaign and the Valley campaign, where he was mortally wounded at Cedar Creek.

== Early life ==
Dodson Ramseur generally did not use his first name; intimate friends called him "Dod". He was born in Lincolnton, North Carolina to Jacob Able and Lucy Mayfield Dodson Ramseur. He was a second cousin to future Confederate generals John Horace Forney and William H. Forney. Ramseur attended Davidson College, where he studied mathematics under Daniel Harvey Hill, another future Confederate general. He continued at the United States Military Academy, graduated in 1860, was commissioned a second lieutenant, and was assigned to the 3rd and 4th U.S. Artillery regiments just before the start of the war. An intensely devout man, he believed slavery a divinely blessed institution, and by the time he entered West Point he bore great hatred for all Northerners.

== Civil War ==
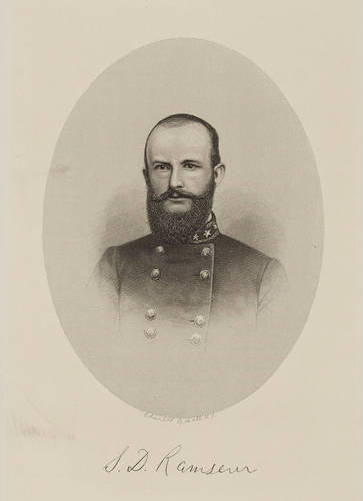
S. D. Ramseur in the Civil War

Ramseur did not wait until North Carolina seceded from the Union, joining the Confederate States Army in Alabama, but quickly transferred to the 10th North Carolina Militia. He became the lieutenant colonel of the 3rd North Carolina Infantry on May 27, 1861. He was injured with a broken collarbone while being thrown from his horse in July and was out of service until the following spring.

=== Peninsula Campaign ===
At the start of the Peninsula Campaign in 1862, Ramseur commanded artillery in Brig. Gen. John B. Magruder's division, but he was elected colonel of the 49th North Carolina Infantry on April 12, 1862. In the Seven Days Battles, Ramseur saw his first significant action at the Battle of Malvern Hill, where he led a futile charge against the strong Union defense and was severely wounded in the right arm. The arm mangled and paralyzed, Ramseur returned home to recuperate. After the Battle of Antietam, he returned from leave as commander of a brigade of four North Carolina regiments in Brig. Gen. Robert E. Rodes's division of Lt. Gen. Thomas J. "Stonewall" Jackson's corps. Promoted to brigadier general on November 1, 1862, he became, at 25 years old, the youngest general in the Confederate army at that time. This was a remarkable accession to rank for someone who had missed so many battles, but Gen. Robert E. Lee had been very impressed by Ramseur's aggressive performance at Malvern Hill.

=== Chancellorsville ===
In the Battle of Chancellorsville, Ramseur's was the lead brigade in Jackson's famous flank march of May 2, 1863, against the Union right. Maj. Gen. J.E.B. Stuart, in temporary command of the corps after Jackson was mortally wounded, ordered three cheers for the brigade's aggressive assault and recommended that Ramseur be promoted to major general; this would not come to pass for another year. Ramseur's performance was actually overly aggressive because his brigade moved out in front of the other brigades too quickly, became exposed, and ran out of ammunition. They had to have reinforcements rush in from the neighboring brigade to help consolidate their gains. His brigade had higher casualties in the battle—more than 50%—than any other Confederate brigade. On the following day, he was wounded again, this time in the leg. General Lee wrote about Ramseur's brigade after the battle:

I consider its brigade and regimental commanders as among the best of their respective grades in the army, and in the battle of Chancellorsville, where the brigade was much distinguished and suffered severely, General Ramseur was among those whose conduct was especially commended to my notice by Lieutenant General Jackson, in a message sent to me after he was wounded.

— Robert E. Lee, Official Report on Chancellorsville

=== Gettysburg ===
In the Battle of Gettysburg, on July 1, 1863, Ramseur's brigade was one of five Rodes led in an assault south from Oak Hill against the right flank of the Union I Corps. Ramseur started in reserve, but the failed attacks by the brigades of Brig. Gens. Alfred Iverson and Edward A. O'Neal required him to move forward to keep the assault from petering out. Rather than repeating their direct assaults, he swung around to the left, across the Mummasburg Road, and hit the defenders in the rear, routing them and driving them back through the town. (This assault was not as difficult as Iverson's and O'Neal's because the Union defenders had now only one brigade in position instead of two and they were low on ammunition.) Ramseur was dismayed when ordered to halt the pursuit of his foe at the foot of Cemetery Hill. This was the last fighting at Gettysburg for Ramseur; Rodes's division sat idle just northwest of Cemetery Hill for the next two days and retreated to Virginia with the rest of the Army of Northern Virginia. Ramseur returned home on leave to marry Ellen E. "Nellie" Richmond and they spent three months together in the Confederate army winter encampment.

=== The Wilderness ===
In the Wilderness, the start of Lt. Gen. Ulysses S. Grant's 1864 Overland Campaign, Ramseur was once again kept in reserve. On May 7, 1864, his brigade was called forward and smashed into Maj. Gen. Ambrose Burnside's IX Corps, which was attempting to outflank Ramseur's corps. Both Lee and corps commander Lt. Gen. Richard S. Ewell wrote in admiration of his gallant attack, which drove Burnside's troops back over a half mile. At Spotsylvania Court House, his brigade counterattacked the II Corps of Maj. Gen. Winfield S. Hancock after its assault on the Mule Shoe at the "Bloody Angle". Desperate hand-to-hand fighting, some of the most intense of the war, lasted for over 20 hours. He was wounded again in this attack, shot from his horse in the right arm, but refused to leave the field.

=== Major General ===
Ramseur assumed command of Jubal A. Early's division when that general took over from Ewell after Spotsylvania. He received a temporary promotion to major general on June 1, 1864, becoming at 27 the youngest West Point graduate to ever be promoted to major general in the Confederate Army. He fought at Cold Harbor and was the first division to intercept Grant before he could capture Petersburg.

=== 1864 Valley Campaign ===
In June 1864, Ramseur and the rest of Early's corps was sent by Lee to the Shenandoah Valley to draw Union forces away from Petersburg, in the Valley Campaigns of 1864. They conducted a long and successful raid down the Valley, into Maryland, and reached the outskirts of Washington, D.C., before turning back. Maj. Gen. Philip Sheridan was sent by Grant to drive Early from the Valley. On September 19, 1864, Sheridan attacked the Confederates at the Battle of Opequon, also known as the Third Battle of Winchester. Ramseur's division was routed by a strong Union assault near Stephenson's Depot; Ramseur allegedly wept openly and immaturely blamed his men for the retreat. His colleague Rodes was mortally wounded.

=== Cedar Creek and death ===
In a surprise attack a month later, Early routed two thirds of the Union army at the Battle of Cedar Creek on October 19, but his troops were hungry and exhausted and fell out of their ranks to pillage the Union camp; Ramseur managed to corral a few hundred soldiers out of his division and stood with them in the center of the line as Sheridan counterattacked. They held off the Union assault for an hour and a half. Ramseur displayed great bravery in rallying his troops, but he was mounted conspicuously on horseback and drew continuous fire. He was wounded in the arm and his horse was shot out from under him. A second horse was also killed. On his third horse, he was struck through both lungs and fell, later to be captured by Union soldiers of the 1st Vermont Cavalry.

Dodson Ramseur died the following day near Middletown, Virginia, at Sheridan's headquarters in the Belle Grove Plantation. His last words were, "Bear this message to my precious wife—I die a Christian and hope to meet her in heaven." The day before the battle, word reached Ramseur of the birth of a baby daughter. He is buried near his birthplace, Lincolnton, in St. Luke's Episcopal Cemetery.

Jubal Early's account of Ramseur at Cedar Creek sums up the man and his accomplishments:

Major-General Ramseur fell into the hands of the enemy mortally wounded, and in him not only my command, but the country suffered a heavy loss. He was a most gallant and energetic officer whom no disaster appalled, but his courage and energy seemed to gain new strength in the midst of confusion and disorder. He fell at his post fighting like a lion at bay, and his native State has reason to be proud of his memory.

— Jubal Early, Official Report from Cedar Creek

== Legacy ==
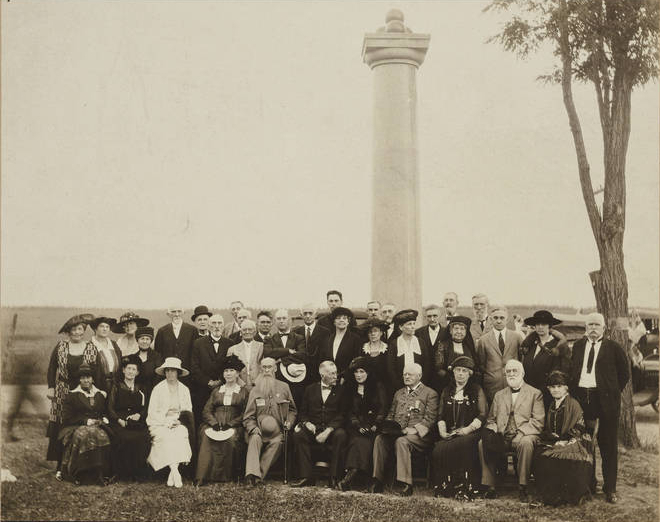
Monument dedication to S. D. Ramseur at Cedar Creek Battlefield near Middletown, Virginia, 1920

The town of Ramseur in eastern Randolph County, North Carolina is named in Ramseur's honor.

A monument on the Cedar Creek battlefield commemorates Ramseur's death in the Belle Grove House.

By chance, Henry A. Dupont, his friend from West Point, was present at Cedar Creek, and years later described his death bed scene.

== In popular culture ==
In MacKinlay Kantor's 1961 alternate history book If the South Had Won the Civil War, Ramseur appears as one of several prominent people who would have campaigned for the abolition of slavery in an independent Confederacy and eventually achieved it by 1885.

In Ralph Peters's 2015 fictionalized account of the Valley Campaigns of 1864, Valley of the Shadow, General Ramseur is a significant character up until his death near the end of the book.

== See also ==
- List of American Civil War generals (Confederate)
