= Thomas Dixon Jr. =

American Baptist minister and writer (1864–1946)

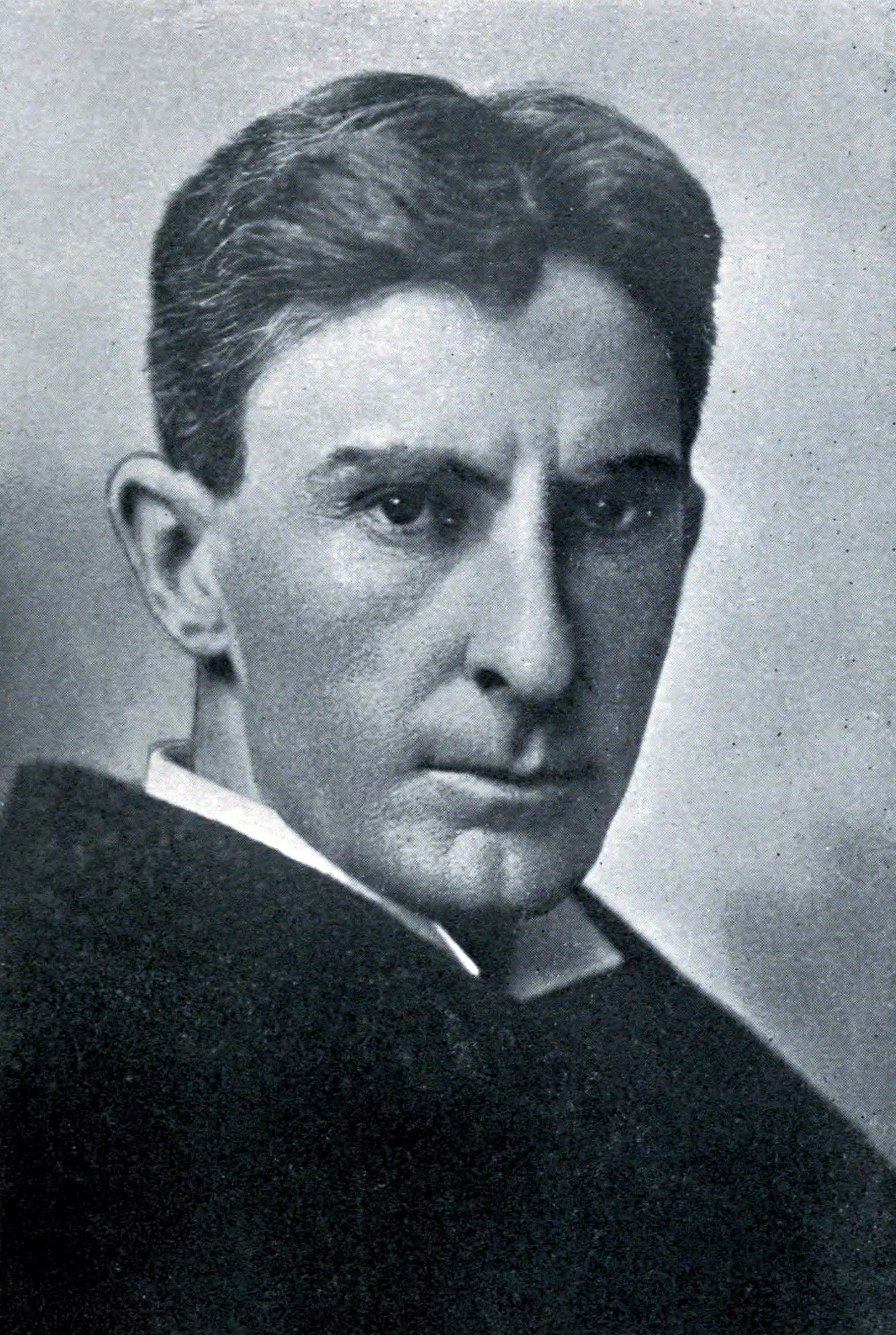
- Born: Thomas Frederick Dixon Jr. January 11, 1864; Shelby, North Carolina, US
- Died: April 3, 1946 (aged 82); Raleigh, North Carolina, US
- Education: Wake Forest College; Johns Hopkins University; Greensboro Law School
- Occupations: Minister; lecturer; writer
- Notable work: The Leopard's Spots; The Clansman (source of The Birth of a Nation)
- Style: Historical romance
- Movement: Lost Cause of the Confederacy
- Spouse(s): Harriet Bussey (m. 1886; died 1937) Madelyn Donovan (m. 1939)
- Children: 3
- Relatives: Amzi Clarence Dixon

Thomas Frederick Dixon Jr. (January 11, 1864 – April 3, 1946) was an American white supremacist and polymath: a Baptist minister, politician, lawyer, lecturer, writer, and filmmaker. Dixon wrote two best-selling novels, The Leopard's Spots: A Romance of the White Man's Burden—1865–1900 (1902) and The Clansman: A Historical Romance of the Ku Klux Klan (1905), that romanticized Southern white supremacy, endorsed the Lost Cause of the Confederacy, opposed equal rights for black people, and glorified the Ku Klux Klan as heroic vigilantes. Film director D. W. Griffith adapted The Clansman for the screen in The Birth of a Nation (1915). The film inspired the creators of the 20th-century rebirth of the Klan.

== Early years ==
Dixon was born in Shelby, North Carolina, the son of Thomas Jeremiah Frederick Dixon Sr. and Amanda Elvira McAfee, daughter of a planter and slave-owner from York County, South Carolina. He was one of eight children, of whom five survived to adulthood. His elder brother, preacher Amzi Clarence Dixon, helped to edit The Fundamentals, a series of articles (and later volumes) influential in fundamentalist Christianity. "He won international acclaim as one of the greatest ministers of his day." His younger brother Frank Dixon was also a preacher and lecturer. His sister, Elizabeth Delia Dixon-Carroll, became a pioneer woman physician in North Carolina and was the doctor for many years at Meredith College in Raleigh, N.C.

Dixon's father, Thomas J. F. Dixon Sr., son of an English–Scottish father and a German mother, was a well-known Baptist minister and a landowner and slave-owner. His maternal grandfather, Frederick Hambright (possible namesake for the fictional North Carolina town of Hambright in which The Leopard's Spots takes place), was a German Palatine immigrant who fought in both the local militia and in the North Carolina Line of the Continental Army during the Revolutionary War. Dixon Sr. had inherited slaves and property through his first wife's father, which were valued at $100,000 in 1862.

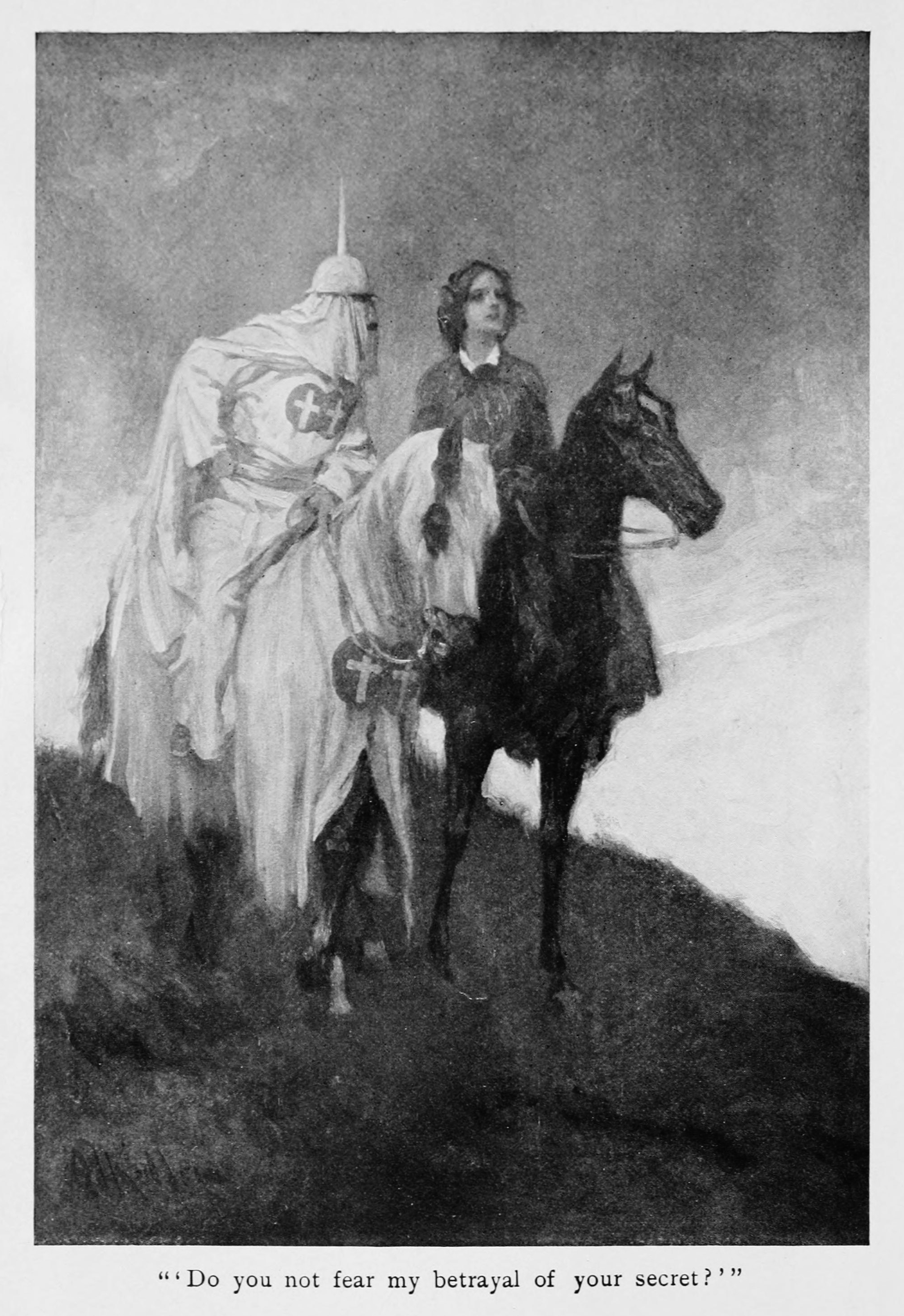
Frontispiece to the first edition of Dixon's The Clansman.

In his adolescence, Dixon helped out on the family farms, an experience that he hated, but he would later say that it helped him relate to the working man's plight. Dixon grew up after the Civil War, during the Reconstruction period. The government confiscation of farmland, coupled with what Dixon saw as the corruption of local politicians, the vengefulness of Union troops, along with the general lawlessness of the period, all served to embitter him, and he became staunchly opposed to the reforms of Reconstruction.

=== Family involvement in the Ku Klux Klan ===
Dixon's father, Thomas Dixon Sr., and his maternal uncle, Col. Leroy McAfee, both joined the Klan early in the Reconstruction era with the aim of "bringing order" to the tumultuous times. McAfee was head of the Ku Klux Klan in Piedmont, North Carolina. "The romantic colonel made a lasting impression on the boy's imagination", and The Clansman was dedicated "To the memory of a Scotch-Irish leader of the South, my uncle, Colonel Leroy McAfee, Grand Titan of the Invisible Empire Ku Klux Klan". Dixon claimed that one of his earliest recollections was of a parade of the Ku Klux Klan through the village streets on a moonlit night in 1869, when Dixon was 5. Another childhood memory was of the widow of a Confederate soldier. She had served under McAfee accusing a black man of the rape of her daughter and seeking Dixon's family's help. Dixon's mother praised the Klan after it had hanged and shot the alleged rapist in the town square.

== Education ==
In 1877, Dixon entered the Shelby Academy, where he earned a diploma in two years. In September 1879, at the age of 15, Dixon followed his older brother and enrolled at the Baptist Wake Forest College, where he studied history and political science. As a student, Dixon performed remarkably well. In 1883, after four years, he earned a master's degree. His record at Wake Forest was outstanding, and he earned the distinction of achieving the highest student honors ever awarded at the university until then. As a student there, he was a founding member of the chapter of Kappa Alpha Order fraternity, and delivered the 1883 Salutatory Address with "wit, humor, pathos and eloquence".

"After his graduation from Wake Forest, Dixon received a scholarship to enroll in the political science program at Johns Hopkins University, "then the leading graduate school in the nation". There he met and befriended fellow student and future President Woodrow Wilson. Wilson was also a Southerner, and Dixon says in his memoirs that "we became intimate friends.... I spent many hours with him in [Wilson's room]." It is documented that Wilson and Dixon took at least one class together: "As a special student in history and politics he undoubtedly felt the influence of Herbert Baxter Adams and his circle of Anglo-Saxon historians, who sought to trace American political institutions back to the primitive democracy of the ancient Germanic tribes. The Anglo-Saxonists were staunch racists in their outlook, believing that only latter-day Aryan or Teutonic nations were capable of self-government." But after only one semester, despite the objections of Wilson, Dixon left Johns Hopkins to pursue journalism and a career on the stage.

Dixon headed to New York City, and while he says in his autobiography that he enrolled briefly at an otherwise unknown Frobisher School of Drama, what he acknowledged publicly was his enrollment in a correspondence course given by the one-man American School of Playwriting, of William Thompson Price. Apparently as an advertisement for the school, he reproduced in the program his handwritten thank-you note.

As an actor, Dixon's physical appearance was a problem. He was 6 feet 3 inches (1.91 m) but only 150 pounds (68 kg), making for a very lanky appearance. One producer remarked that he would not succeed as an actor because of his appearance, but Dixon was complimented for his intelligence and attention to detail. The producer recommended that Dixon put his love for the stage into scriptwriting. Despite the compliment, Dixon returned home to North Carolina in shame.

Upon his return to Shelby, Dixon quickly realized that he was in the wrong place to begin to cultivate his playwriting skills. After the initial disappointment from his rejection, Dixon, with the encouragement of his father, enrolled in the short-lived Greensboro Law School, in Greensboro, North Carolina. An excellent student, Dixon received his law degree in 1885.

== Political career ==
It was during law school that Dixon's father convinced Thomas Jr. to enter politics. After graduation, Dixon ran for the local seat in the North Carolina General Assembly as a Democrat. Despite being only 20 years of age and too young to vote, he won the 1884 election by a 2-1 margin, a victory that was attributed to his eloquence. Dixon retired from politics in 1886 after only one term in the legislature. He said that he was disgusted by the corruption and the backdoor deals of the lawmakers, and he is quoted as referring to politicians as "the prostitutes of the masses." However short, Dixon's political career gained him popularity throughout the South as he was the first to champion Confederate veterans' rights.

Following his career in politics, Dixon practiced private law for a short time, but he found little satisfaction as a lawyer and soon left the profession to become a minister.

== Dixon's thought ==
Dixon saw himself, and wanted to be remembered as, a man of ideas. He described himself as a reactionary.

Dixon claimed to be a friend of black people, but he believed that they would never be the equal of whites, who he believed had superior intelligence; according to him, blacks could not benefit much even from the best education. He thought giving them the vote was a mistake, if not a disaster, and the Reconstruction Amendments were "insane".

He favored returning black people to Africa, although, since there were nearly 7.5 million black Americans by 1890, this was not a realistic position.

Historian Albert Bushnell Hart indicates the implacability of Dixon's opposition to the advancement of blacks, quoting Dixon: "Make a negro a scientific and successful farmer, and let him plant his feet deep in your soil, and it will mean a race war."

In his autobiography, Dixon claims to have personally witnessed the following:

- The Freedmen's Bureau arrived in Shelby and told black people there that they could have "the franchise" (the vote), if they swore to support the constitutions of the United States and North Carolina. The black people then brought to their meetings with the agent enormous baskets, large jugs, huge bags, wheelbarrows, and wagons, as "all" thought "the franchise" was something tangible.
- He listened as a widow with her daughter told his uncle about the rape of the daughter by a black man whom Reconstruction governor William W. Holden had just pardoned and freed from prison. Dixon saw him lynched by the Klan.
- A Freedmen's Bureau agent told a former slave of Dixon's grandmother that he was free and could go where he pleased. The man did not want to leave, and when the agent kept repeating his message, threw a hatchet at him, which missed.
- In Columbia, South Carolina, about 1868, he saw "a black driver of a truck strike a little white boy of about six with a whip." The boy's mother rebuked the driver, for which she was arrested, and Dixon followed them into the courtroom, where a black magistrate fined her $10 for "insulting a freedman." His uncle and a friend paid the fine for her.
- When he was 7, the South Carolina House of Representatives had 94 black people and 30 white people; 23 of them not from South Carolina. When he visited at this time, he saw that some members were well dressed, "preachers in frock coats." However, "a lot" were "barefooted," "many" of them were "in overalls covered with red mud," and "the space behind the seats of the members was strewn with corks, broken bottles, stale crusts, greasy pieces of paper and bones picked clean." Without debate, the legislature voted the presiding officer receive $2000 for "the arduous duties...performed this week for the State." A page told Dixon that he was not receiving his $20 per day pay. The chamber "reek[ed] of vile cigars and stale whisky," and "the odor of perspiring negroes," which he mentions twice. Karen Crowe finds his memories about this trip "particularly confused"; his chronology not being correct.
- During the elections of 1870, the Klan warned black people in North Carolina who could not read their ballot not to cast it. His uncle was their chief.

In addition, because his uncle was very involved in both the Klan and other local politics, residents funded him to go to Washington on their behalf. He received many reports about other alleged misconduct by black people and their white allies who controlled government in North Carolina.

Dixon had a particular hatred for Radical Republican Thaddeus Stevens, leader in the House of Representatives, because he supported land confiscation from whites and its distribution to blacks (see 40 acres and a mule). According to Dixon, Stevens wanted "to make the South Negroid territory." Historians do not support many of his charges.

Dixon also opposed women's suffrage. "His prejudices against women are more subtle." "For him, though a woman's real fulfillment lies most assuredly in marriage, the best example of that institution is one in which she takes an equal part."

Dixon was also concerned with threats of communism and war. "Civilization was threatened by socialists, by involvement of the U.S. in European affairs, finally, by communists... He saw civilization as a somewhat fragile quality thing threatened with wreck and ruin from all sides."

== Minister ==
Dixon was ordained as a Baptist minister on October 6, 1886. That month, church records show that he moved to the parsonage at 125 South John Street in Goldsboro, North Carolina, to serve as the Pastor of the First Baptist Church. Already a lawyer and fresh out of Wake Forest Seminary, life in Goldsboro must not have been what young Dixon had been expecting for a first preaching assignment. The social upheaval that Dixon portrays in his later works was largely melded through Dixon's experiences in the post-war Wayne County during Reconstruction.

On April 10, 1887, Dixon moved to the Second Baptist Church in Raleigh, North Carolina. His popularity rose quickly, and before long, he was offered a position at the large Dudley Street Baptist Church (razed in 1964) in Roxbury, Boston, Massachusetts. He was unpleasantly surprised to find prejudice there against black people; he always said he was a friend of black people. As his popularity on the pulpit grew, so did the demand for him as a lecturer. While preaching in Boston, Dixon was asked to give the commencement address at Wake Forest College. Additionally, he was offered a possible honorary doctorate from the college. Dixon himself rejected the offer, but he sang high praises about a then-unknown man Dixon believed deserved the honor, his old friend Woodrow Wilson. A reporter at Wake Forest who heard Dixon's praises of Wilson put a story on the national wire, giving Wilson his first national exposure.

In August 1889, although his Boston congregation was willing to double his pay if he would stay, Dixon accepted a post in New York City. There he would preach at new heights, rubbing elbows with the likes of John D. Rockefeller and Theodore Roosevelt (whom he helped in a campaign for New York governor). He had "the largest congregation of any Protestant minister in the United States." "As pastor of the Twenty-third Street Baptist Church in New York City…his audiences soon outgrew the church and, pending the construction of a new People's Temple, Dixon was forced to hold services in a neighboring YMCA." Thousands were turned away. John D. Rockefeller offered a $500,000 matching grant for Dixon's dream, "the building of a great temple". However, it never took place.

In 1895, Dixon resigned his position, saying that "for reaching of the non-church-going masses, I am convinced that the machinery of a strict Baptist church is a hindrance", and that he wished for "a perfectly free pulpit". The Board of the church had expressed to him three times their desire to leave Association Hall and return to the church's building; according to them, the crowds attending were not making enough donations to cover the Hall's rental, for which reason there was "a gradual increase of the indebtedness of the church, without any prospect for a change for the better." It was also reported at the time of his resignation that "For a long time past there have been dissensions among the members of the Twenty-Third street Baptist church, due to the objections of the more conservative members of the congregation to the 'sensational' character of the sermons preached during the last five years by the pastor, Rev. Thomas Dixon, Jr." A published letter from "An Old-Fashioned Clergyman" accused him of "sensationalism in the pulpit"; he responded that he was sensationalistic, but this was preferable to "the stupidity, failure, and criminal folly of tradition," an example of which was "putting on women's clothes [clerical robes] in the hope of adding to my dignity on Sunday by the judicious use of dry goods."

In 1896 Dixon's Failure of Protestantism in New York and its causes appeared.

"Dixon decided to move on and form a new church, the People's Church (sometimes described as the People's Temple), in the auditorium of the Academy of Music;" this was a nondenominational church. He continued preaching there until 1899, when he began to lecture full-time.

When absent giving lectures, "the only man I could find who could hold my big crowd" was socialist Eugene V. Debs, whom Dixon speaks very highly of.

"While pastor of the People's church [sic] in New York he was once indicted on a charge of criminal libel for his pulpit attacks on city officials. When the warrant of arrest was served on him he set about looking up the records of the members of the grand jury which had indicted him. Then he denounced the jury from his pulpit. The proceedings were dropped."

== Lecturer ==
Dixon was someone "who had something to say to the world and meant to say it." He had "something burning in his heart for utterance." He insisted repeatedly that he was only telling the truth, furnished documentation when challenged, and asked his critics to point out any untruths in his works, even announcing a reward for anyone who could. The reward was not claimed.

Dixon enjoyed lecturing, and found it "an agreeable pastime". "Success on the platform was the easiest thing I ever tried." He went on the Chautauqua circuit, and was often hailed as the best lecturer in the nation. He tells us in his autobiography that as a lecturer, "I always spoke without notes after careful preparation". Over four years he was heard by an estimated 5,000,000 attendees, sometimes exceeding 6,000 at a single program. He gained an immense following throughout the country, particularly in the South, where he played up his speeches on the plight of the working man and what he called the horrors of Reconstruction.

[H]e can whirl words and ideas at an audience as few men can.... He spoke on the "New America" before an audience that nearly filled the opera house. The people held their breath and listened, they clapped their hands, they laughed and sometimes some of them cried a little, and when the lecturer[,] after a magnificent close, bowed himself off the platform, they felt wronged that they had paid fifty cents apiece to hear so short an address; then they looked at their watches to find that they had been listening two hours.

About 1896, Dixon had a breakdown caused by overwork. He had lived on 94th St. in Manhattan and on Staten Island, but did not like the weather, "and the doctor had come to see us every week". The doctor said he should "live in the country". Now wealthy, in 1897 Dixon purchased "a stately colonial home, Elmington Manor", in Gloucester County, Virginia. The house had 32 rooms and the grounds were 500 acres (200 ha). He had his own post office, Dixondale. The same year he had an 80 feet (24 m) steam yacht built, which required a crew of "two men and a boy"; he named it Dixie. He says in his autobiography that one year he paid income tax on $210,000. "I felt...I had more money than I could possibly spend."

== Becoming a novelist ==
It was during such a lecture tour that Dixon attended a theatrical version of Harriet Beecher Stowe's Uncle Tom's Cabin. Dixon could hardly contain his anger and outrage at the play, and it is said that he literally "wept at [the play's] misrepresentation of southerners." Dixon vowed that the "true story" of the South should be told. As a direct result of that experience, Dixon wrote his first novel, The Leopard's Spots (1902), which uses several characters, including Simon Legree, recycled from Stowe's novel. It and its successor, The Clansman, were published by Doubleday, Page & Company (and contributed significantly to the publisher's success). Dixon turned to Doubleday because he had a "long friendship" with fellow North Carolinian Walter Hines Page. Doubleday accepted The Leopard's Spots immediately. The entire first edition was sold before it was printed—"an unheard of thing for a first novel". It sold over 100,000 copies in the first 6 months, and the reviews were "generous beyond words".

== Dixon as novelist ==
Dixon turned to writing books as a way to present his ideas to an even larger audience. Dixon's "Trilogy of Reconstruction" consisted of The Leopard's Spots (1902), The Clansman (1905), and The Traitor (1907). (In his autobiography, he says that in creating trilogies, he was following the model of Polish novelist Henryk Sienkiewicz.) Dixon's novels were best-sellers in their time, despite being racist pastiches of historical romance fiction. They glorify an antebellum American South white supremacist viewpoint. Dixon claimed to oppose slavery, but he espoused racial segregation and vehemently opposed universal suffrage and miscegenation. He was "a spokesman for southern Jim Crow segregation and for American racism in general. Yet he did nothing more than reiterate the comments of others."

"I thank God that there is not to-day the clang of a single slave's chain in this continent. Slavery may have had its beneficent aspects, but democracy is the destiny of the race, because all men are bound together in the bonds of fraternal equality with common love." -Thomas Dixon Jr., 1896 from Protestantism and Its Causes, New York	"...no amount of education of any kind, industrial, classical or religious, can make a Negro a white man or bridge the chasm of centuries which separate him from the white man in the evolution of human nature." -Thomas Dixon Jr., 1905 from "Booker T. Washington and the Negro", p. 1, Saturday Evening Post, August 19, 1905.

Dixon's Reconstruction-era novels depict Northerners as greedy carpetbaggers and white Southerners as victims. Dixon's Clansman caricatures the Reconstruction as an era of "black rapists" and "blonde-haired" victims, and if his racist opinions were unknown, the vile and gratuitous brutality and Klan terror in which the novel revels might be read as satire. If "Dixon used the motion picture as a propaganda tool for his often outrageous opinions on race, communism, socialism, and feminism," D. W. Griffith, in his movie adaptation of the novel, The Birth of a Nation (1915), is a case in point. Dixon wrote a highly successful stage adaptation of The Clansman in 1905. In The Leopard's Spots, the Reverend Durham character indoctrinates Charles Gaston, the protagonist, with a foul-mouthed diatribe of hate speech. Equally, Dixon's opposition to miscegenation seemed to be as much about confused sexism as it was about racism, as he opposed relationships between white women and black men but not between black women and white men.

Another pet hate for Dixon and the focus of another trilogy was socialism: The One Woman: A Story of Modern Utopia (1903), Comrades: A Story of Social Adventure in California (1909), and The Root of Evil (1911), the latter of which also discusses some of the problems involved in modern industrial capitalism. The book Comrades was made into a motion picture, entitled Bolshevism on Trial, released in 1919.

Dixon wrote 22 novels, as well as many plays, sermons, and works of non-fiction. W.E.B. DuBois said he was more widely read than Henry James. His writing centered on three major themes: racial purity, the evils of socialism, and the traditional family role of woman as wife and mother. (Dixon opposed female suffrage.) A common theme found in his novels is violence against white women, mostly by Southern black men. The crimes are almost always avenged through the course of the story, the source of which might stem from a belief of Dixon's that his mother had been sexually abused as a child. He wrote his last novel, The Flaming Sword, in 1939 and not long after was disabled by a cerebral hemorrhage.

While The Birth of a Nation is still viewed for its crucial role in the birth of the feature film, none of Dixon's novels have stood the test of time. When Publishers Weekly listed the best-selling fiction of the last quarter century, none of Dixon's books was included.

== Dixon as playwright ==
After the successful publication of The Clansman, Dixon proceeded to adapt it for the stage. It opened in Norfolk on September 22, 1905, and toured the south with great commercial success before venturing into receptive northern markets such as Indianapolis. One Dixon biographer, reviewing the script, noted its conspicuous gaps in character and plot development. No background or justification is offered for Nathan Bedford Forrest, the Klan or the institution of lynching, but the play nonetheless excited the passions of southern audiences that took these for granted. Contemporary newspaper and religious criticism, even in the south, was less favorable. Journalists called the play a "riot breeder" and an "exhibition of hysterics" while an Atlanta Baptist minister denounced it as a slander on white southerners as well as black. The Clansman played in New York in 1906, again to an enthusiastic audience and critical panning, while Dixon gave speeches around the city and unsuccessfully offered Booker T. Washington a bribe to repudiate racial equality.

Dixon created other plays through 1920, both adapted and original. All of them continued his racial and sectional themes except for the 1919 anti-communist drama The Red Dawn. His 1910 miscegenation drama The Sins of the Father struggled after its initial run in Norfolk. Dixon took over as the lead actor (later stating, dubiously, that the original actor was killed by a shark) and performed for a thirty-week tour. According to Dixon family tradition his stage talent was inadequate, and the play failed to find a venue in New York. He stated that all of his racial dramas were intended to prove that coexistence was impossible and that separation was the only solution.

== Dixon as filmmaker ==
Turning The Clansman into a movie was the next step, reaching more people with even more impact. As he said à propos of The Fall of a Nation (1916): the movie "reached more than thirty million people and was, therefore, thirty times more effective than any book I might have written."

== Attitudes towards the revived Klan ==
Dixon was an extreme nationalist, chauvinist, racist, reactionary ideologue, although "at the height of his fame, Dixon might well have been considered a liberal by many." He spoke favorably several times of Jews and Catholics. He distanced himself from the "bigotry" of the revived "second era" Ku Klux Klan, which he saw as "a growing menace to the cause of law and order", and its members "unprincipled marauders" (and they in turn attacked Dixon). It seems that he inferred that the "Reconstruction Klan" members were not bigots. "He condemned the secret organization for ignoring civilized government and encouraging riot, bloodshed, and anarchy." He denounced antisemitism as "mean", pointing out that the mother of Jesus was Jewish. He said "The Jewish race Is the most persistent, powerful, commercially successful race that the world has ever produced." While lauding the "loyalty and good citizenship" of Catholics, he claimed it was the "duty of whites to lift up and help" the supposedly "weaker races."

At a meeting on 22 January 1923, held by the American Unity League at Century Theatre in New York, Dixon made a speech against the revived Klan:

Its proscription of the negro race under the conditions of modern life is utterly uncalled for, stupid and inhuman. If the white man is superior-as I believe he is-it is our duty as citizens of a democracy to lift up and help the weaker race. The Klan assault upon the foreigner is the acme of stupidity and inhumanity. We are all foreigners except the few Indians we haven't killed. Some of us landed yesterday. Some of us a few years ago. All came as refugees from the tyranny and anguish of the Old World.

Our fathers who landed before the Revolution blazed the way through the wilderness for the trembling feet of liberty. They built a beacon on these shores, flashing its rays of hope to all the oppressed of the earth. Shall we, their sons, meet the humble immigrant of today at the water's edge with a mask and dagger and push him back into hell? If this is 100 per cent. Americanism, I for one spit on it.

== Family ==
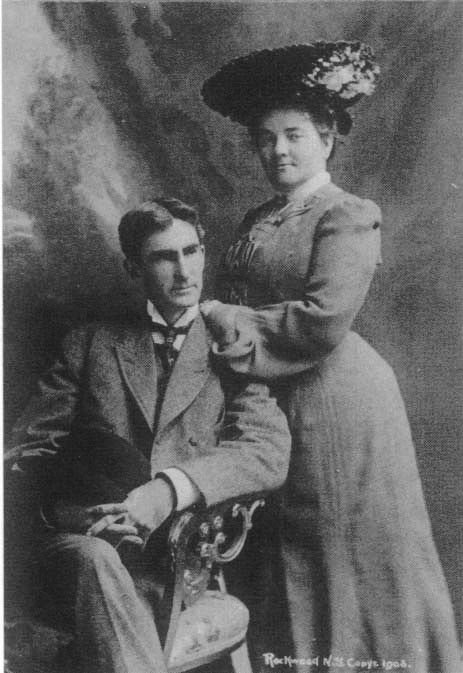
Dixon and his first wife Harriet

Dixon married Harriet Bussey on March 3, 1886. The couple eloped to Montgomery, Alabama after Bussey's father refused to give his consent to the marriage.

Dixon and Harriet Bussey had three children together: Thomas III, Louise, and Jordan.

== Final years ==
Dixon's final years were not financially comfortable. "He had lost his house on Riverside Drive in New York, which he had occupied for twenty-five years.... His books no longer became...best sellers." The money he earned from his first books he lost on the stock and cotton exchanges in the crash of 1907. "His final venture in the late 1920s was a vacation resort," Wildacres Retreat, in Little Switzerland, North Carolina. "After he had spent a vast amount of money on its development, the enterprise collapsed as speculative bubbles in land across the country began to burst before the crash of 1929." He ended his career as an impoverished court clerk in Raleigh, North Carolina.

Harriet died on December 29, 1937, and fourteen months later, on February 26, 1939, Dixon had a debilitating cerebral hemorrhage. Less than a month later, from his hospital bed, Dixon married Madelyn Donovan, an actress thirty years his junior, who had played a role in a film adaptation of Mark of the Beast. She had also been his research assistant on The Flaming Sword, his last novel. The marriage "induced indignation and outrage among his remaining relatives", who viewed her as a "bad woman". She cared for him for the next seven years, taking over his duties as clerk when he could no longer work. He tried to provide for her future financial security, giving her the rights to all his property. He says nothing about her in his autobiography.

Dixon died on April 3, 1946. He is buried, with Madelyn, in Sunset Cemetery in Shelby, North Carolina.

== Archival material ==
The Thomas Frederick Dixon Jr. Collection, in the John R. Dover Memorial Library at Gardner-Webb University in Boiling Springs, North Carolina, contains documents, manuscripts, biographical works, and other materials pertaining to the life and literary career of Thomas Dixon. It also holds fifteen hundred volumes from Dixon's personal book collection and nine paintings which became illustrations in his novels.

Additional archival material is in the Duke University Library.

== List of works ==
=== Novels ===
- The Leopard's Spots: A Romance of the White Man's Burden—1865–1900 (1902) (Part 1 of the trilogy on Reconstruction)
- The One Woman: A Story of Modern Utopia (1903) (Part 1 of the trilogy on socialism)
- The Clansman: A Historical Romance of the Ku Klux Klan (1905) (Part 2 of the trilogy on Reconstruction)
- The Traitor: A Story of the Fall of the Invisible Empire (1907) (Part 3 of the trilogy on Reconstruction)
- Comrades: A Story of Social Adventure in California (1909) (Part 2 of the trilogy on socialism)
- The Root of Evil (1911) (Part 3 of the trilogy on socialism) An attack on capitalism
- The Sins of the Father: A Romance of the South (1912), on miscegenation
- The Southerner: A Romance of the Real Lincoln (1913) (First of three novels on Southern heroes)
- The Victim: A Romance of the Real Jefferson Davis (1914) (Second of three novels on Southern heroes) Text from FadedPage. Text from Project Gutenberg. Original pages, from Kentucky Digital Library.
- The Foolish Virgin: A Romance of Today (1915) (opposes emancipation of women)
- The Fall of a Nation. A Sequel to The Birth of a Nation (1916)
- The Way of a Man. A Story of the New Woman (1918)
- The Man in Gray. A Romance of North and South (1921), on Robert E. Lee (Third of three novels on Southern heroes)
- The Black Hood (1924) (on the Ku Klux Klan)
- The Love Complex (1925). Based on The Foolish Virgin.
- The Sun Virgin (1929) (On Francisco Pizarro.)
- Companions (1931) (Based on The One Woman.)
- The Flaming Sword (1939), on the dangers of Communism for the United States (in the novel, Communists take over the country)

=== Theater ===
- From College to Prison, play, Wake Forest Student, January 1883.
- The Clansman (1905). Produced by George H. Brennan. Multiple touring companies simultaneously.
- The Traitor (1908), written in collaboration with Channing Pollock, whose name got first billing over that of Dixon
- The Sins of the Father (1909) Antedates 1912 publication of the novel. Dixon toured playing a main part after the actor was killed. "The Dixon family was of the opinion that he was absolutely lousy on stage."
- Old Black Joe, one act (1912)
- The Almighty Dollar (1912)
- The Leopard's Spots (1913)
- The One Woman (1918)
- The Invisible Foe (1918). Written by Walter Hackett; produced and directed by Dixon.
- The Red Dawn: A Drama of Revolution (1919, unpublished)
- Robert E. Lee, a play in five acts (1920)
- A Man of the People. A Drama of Abraham Lincoln (1920). "The three-act drama dealt with the Republican National Committee's request that Lincoln stand down as candidate for president at the end of his first term in office and Lincoln's conflict with George B. McClellan. The third-act climax had Jefferson Davis and Robert E. Lee receiving news of General Sherman's capture of Atlanta. Lincoln reappeared in the epilogue to deliver his second inaugural address." According to IMDb, it had only 15 performances. IMDb cast list

=== Cinema ===
- The Birth of a Nation (1915)
- The Fall of a Nation (1916) (lost)
- The Foolish Virgin (1916)
- The One Woman (1918)
- Bolshevism on Trial, based on Comrades (1919)
- Wing Toy (1921) (lost)
- Where Men Are Men (1921)
- Bring Him In (1921) "Based on a story by H. H. Van Loan."
- Thelma (1922)
- The Mark of the Beast (1923) The only film Dixon directed as well as wrote and produced. It is equally important for bringing Madelyn Donovan openly into his life.
- The Brass Bowl (1924) "Based on the novel by Louis Joseph Vance."
- The Great Diamond Mystery (1924) "Based on a story by Shannon Fife."
- The Painted Lady (1924) "Based on the Saturday Evening Post story by Larry Evans."
- The Foolish Virgin (1924) (lost)
- Champion of Lost Causes (1925) "Based on the Flynn's magazine story by Max Brand."
- The Trail Rider (1925) "Based on the novel by George Washington Ogden."
- The Gentle Cyclone (1926) "Based on the Western Story Magazine story "Peg Leg and Kidnapper" by Frank R. Buckley."
- The torch; a story of the paranoiac who caused a great war (screenplay, self-published, 1934). On John Brown, who Dixon presents as a madman, receiving "most of the blame for having touched off the 'powder keg' that caused the Civil War."
- Nation Aflame (1937)

=== Non-fiction ===
- Living problems in religion and social science (sermons) (1889)
- What is religion? : an outline of vital ritualism : four sermons preached in Association Hall, New York, December 1890 (1891)
- Dixon on Ingersoll. Ten discourses, delivered in Association Hall, New York. With a Sketch of the Author by Nym Crinkle (1892)
- The failure of Protestantism in New York and its causes (1896)
- An open letter from Rev. Thomas Dixon to J.C. Beam. Read it. (self-published pamphlet, 1896?)
- Dixon's sermons. Vol. i, no. i-v. i, no. 4. : a monthly magazine (1898) (Pamphlets on the Spanish–American War.)
- The Free lance. Vol. i, no. 5-v. i, no. 9. : a monthly magazine (1898–1899) (Collection of five speeches, published in the magazine, on the Spanish–American War.)
- Dixon's Sermons : Delivered in the Grand Opera House, New York, 1898-1899 (1899)
- The Life Worth Living: A Personal Experience (1905)
- The hope of the world; a story of the coming war (self-published pamphlet, 1925)
- The Inside Story of the Harding Tragedy. New York: The Churchill Company, 1932. With Harry M. Daugherty.
- A dreamer in Portugal; the story of Bernarr Macfadden's mission to continental Europe (1934)
- Southern Horizons : The Autobiography of Thomas Dixon (1984)

=== Articles ===
- Thomas Dixon, Jr. (March 1883). "The New South". Wake Forest Student. Vol. 2, no. 7. Address of the Euzelian Orator on the occasion of the anniversary of the Literary Societies, February 16, 1883. pp. 283–292.
- Thomas Dixon, Jr. (September 1905). "The Story of Ku Klux Klan. Some of its leaders, living and dead. Illustrated with photographs, prints and drawings by A. I. Keller". Metropolitan Magazine. Vol. 22, no. 6. Reproduced in its entirety in The Tennessean, August 27, 1905. pp. 657–669.

== Bibliography ==
- Crowe, Karen, ed. (1984). Southern Horizons: The Autobiography of Thomas Dixon. Alexandria, Virginia: IWV Publishing. OCLC 11398740. Republished from Crowe, Karen (1982). Southern horizons: the autobiography of Thomas Dixon: a critical edition (Thesis). OCLC 10307551. ProQuest 303250905.
- Lehr, Dick (2017). The birth of a movement: how "Birth of a Nation" ignited the battle for civil rights (2nd ed.). New York: PublicAffairs. ISBN 978-1-58648-987-8.
- Gillespie, Michele K.; Hall, Randal L. (2006). Thomas Dixon Jr. and the Birth of Modern America. Louisiana State University Press. ISBN 0-8071-3130-X.
- Slide, Anthony (2004). American Racist: The Life and Films of Thomas Dixon. The University Press of Kentucky. ISBN 978-0-8131-7191-3. Project MUSE book 10080.
- McGee, Brian R. (2000). "Thomas Dixon's The Clansman: Radicals, Reactionaries, and the Anticipated Utopia". Southern Communication Journal. 65 (4): 300–317. doi:10.1080/10417940009373178. S2CID 143698914.
- McGee, Brian R. "The Argument from Definition Revised: Race and Definition in the Progressive Era", pp. 141–158, Argumentation and Advocacy, Vol. 35 (1999)
- Gilmore, Glenda Elizabeth. Gender and Jim Crow: Women and the Politics of White Supremacy in North Carolina, 1986–1920. Chapel Hill: The University of North Carolina Press, 1996. ISBN 0-8078-2287-6
- Williamson, Joel. A Rage for Order: Black-White Relations in the American South Since Emancipation, Oxford, 1986. ISBN 0-19-504025-2
- Roberts, Samuel K. (1980). "Kelly Miller and Thomas Dixon Jr. on Blacks in American Civilization". Phylon. 41 (2): 202–209. doi:10.2307/274972. JSTOR 274972.
- Cook, Raymond A. (1974). Thomas Dixon. Twayne. ISBN 0-8057-0206-7.
- Davenport, F. Garvin Jr. (August 1970). "Thomas Dixon's Mythology of Southern History". Journal of Southern History. 36 (3): 350–367. doi:10.2307/2206199. JSTOR 2206199.
- Bloomfield, Maxwell (1964). "Dixon's The Leopard's Spots: A Study in Popular Racism". American Quarterly. 16 (3): 387–401. doi:10.2307/2710931. JSTOR 2710931.
