= The Clansman: A Historical Romance of the Ku Klux Klan =

Book by Thomas Dixon

The Clansman
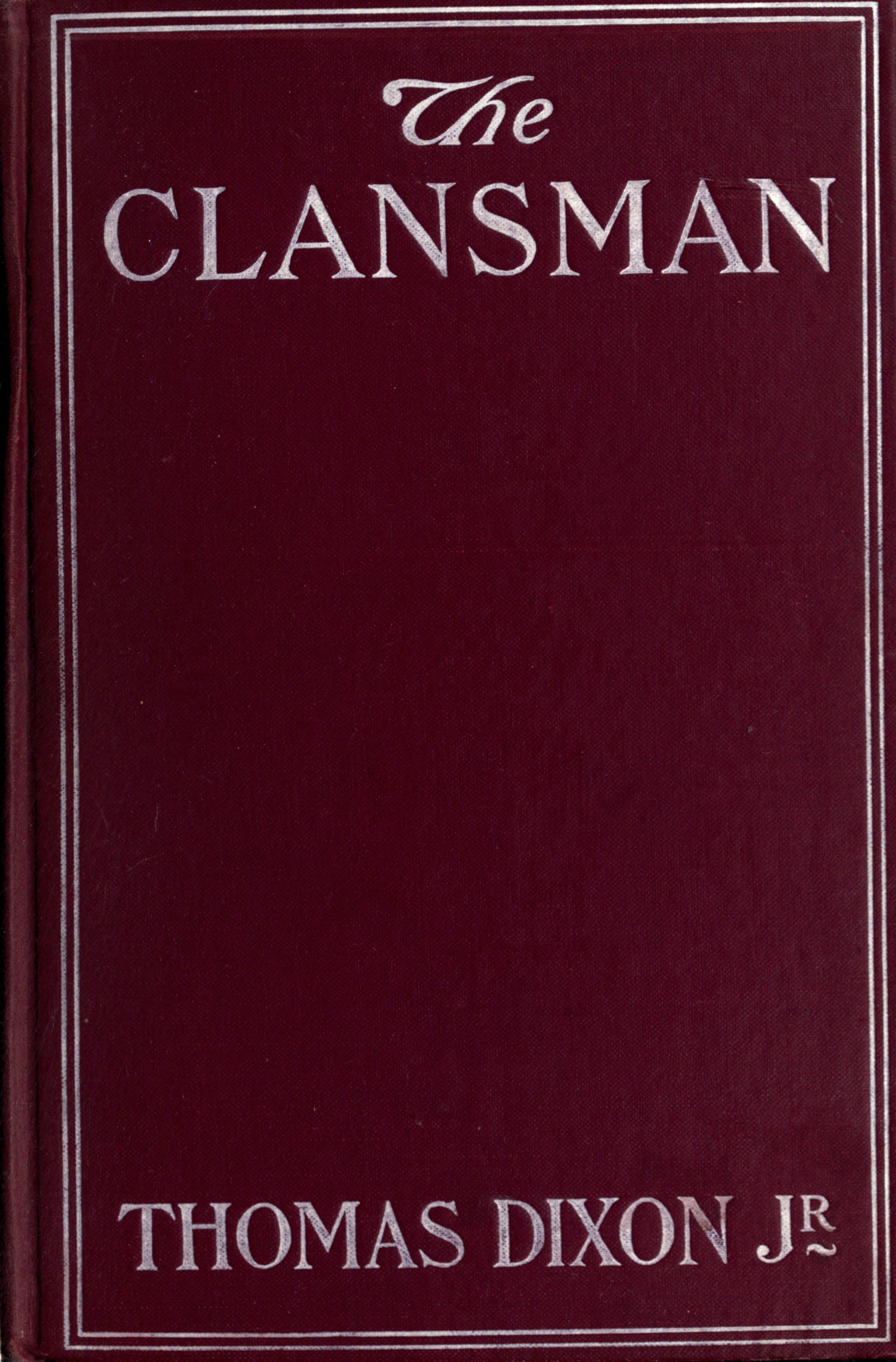
- Authors: Thomas Dixon Jr.
- Language: English
- Genre: Lost Cause myth, historical fiction
- Publication date: 1905
- Preceded by: The Leopard's Spots
- Followed by: The Traitor

The Clansman: A Historical Romance of the Ku Klux Klan is a novel published in 1905, the second work in the Ku Klux Klan trilogy by Thomas Dixon Jr. (the others are The Leopard's Spots and The Traitor). Chronicling the American Civil War and Reconstruction era from a pro-Confederate perspective, it presents the Ku Klux Klan heroically. The novel was adapted first by the author as a highly successful play entitled The Clansman (1905), and a decade later by D. W. Griffith in the 1915 movie The Birth of a Nation.

Dixon's novel portrays free blacks engaged in massive violent crimes against whites. He later claimed that 18,000,000 Southerners supported his beliefs. Dixon portrays the Radical Republican speaker of the house, Austin Stoneman (based on Thaddeus Stevens, from Pennsylvania), as a rapacious, vindictive, race traitor, mad with power and eaten up with hate. His goal is to punish the Southern whites for their revolution against an "oppressive" government (the Union) by turning the former slaves against the white Southerners and using the iron fist of the Union occupation troops to make them the new masters. In Dixon's characterization, the Klan's job is to protect white Southerners from the carpetbaggers and their allies, black and white.

The novel and its stage and film adaptations were highly controversial in their time, and continue to receive criticism for their espousal of racist and Neo-Confederate sentiments. In addition to concerns that The Clansman would stir up political and racial tensions in the South, Dixon's portrayal of the Klan as chivalrous freedom fighters was ridiculed as absurd.

== Characters ==
- Austin Stoneman – Northern political leader who advocates and implements Reconstruction in the conquered Southern States; introduces bill to impeach President Andrew Johnson
- Elsie Stoneman – daughter of the above; defies father's wishes by falling in love with young Southerner Ben Cameron
- Phil Stoneman – son and brother of the above; falls in love with Southerner Margaret Cameron
- Lydia Brown – Austin Stoneman's mulatto housekeeper
- Silas Lynch – mulatto assistant to Austin Stoneman; aids him in implementing Reconstruction on the defiant Southerners
- Marion Lenoir – Fifteen-year-old white girl who was Ben Cameron's childhood sweetheart; after being brutally raped by Gus, she commits suicide by jumping off a cliff
- Jeannie Lenoir – mother of the above; joins her daughter in fatal cliff leap
- Gus – a former slave of the Camerons; rapes Marion and is then captured and executed by the Ku Klux Klan, under the supervision of the "Grand Dragon" Ben Cameron
- Dr. Richard Cameron – a Southern doctor, falsely charged with complicity in the assassination of Abraham Lincoln
- Mrs. Gloria Cameron – wife of Dr. Richard Cameron
- Benjamin ("Ben") Cameron – son of the above and the hero of the novel; falls in love with Northerner Elsie Stoneman; fought for the South in the Civil War and later joins the Ku Klux Klan in defiance of Reconstruction
- Margaret Cameron – sister of the above
- Mammy
- Jake
- President Abraham Lincoln – portrayed as a sympathetic character to white supremacy, who sought to restore normalcy by shipping former slaves back to Africa
- President Andrew Johnson – Lincoln's vice president and successor, who, much like in real life, was impeached in Congress for opposing Reconstruction

== Plot ==
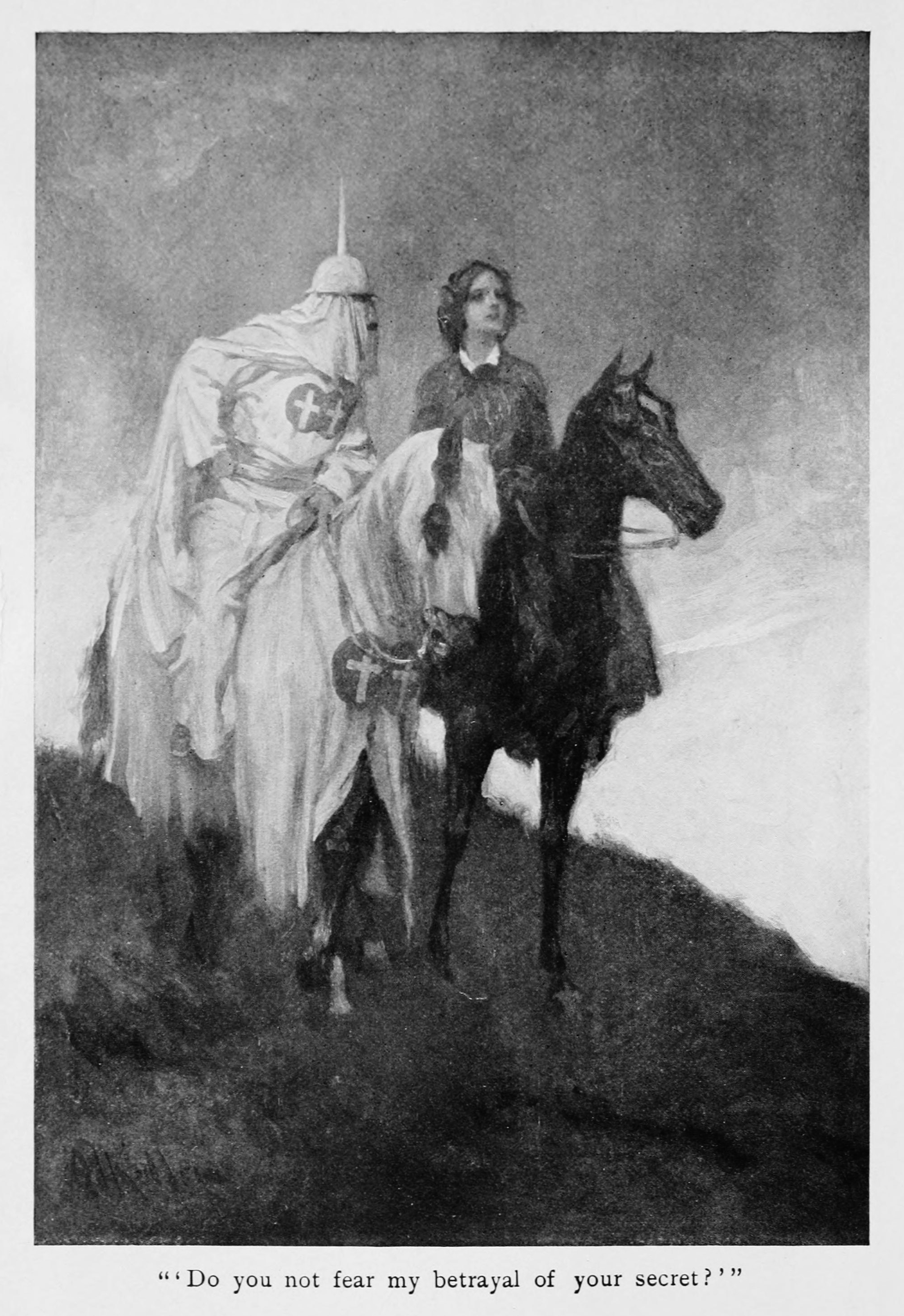
Frontispiece to the first edition of Dixon's The Clansman, by Arthur I. Keller

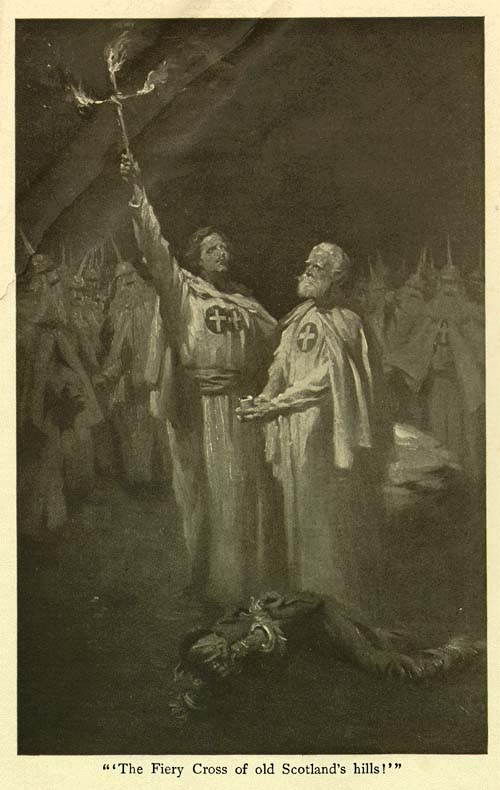
"The Fiery Cross of old Scotland's hills!" Illustration from the first edition of The Clansman, by Arthur I. Keller. Note figures in background.

In The Clansman, Reconstruction was an attempt by Austin Stoneman, a thinly veiled reference to Representative Thaddeus Stevens of Pennsylvania, to ensure that the Republican Party would stay in power by securing the Southern black vote. Stoneman's hatred for President Johnson stems from Johnson's refusal to disenfranchise Southern whites. His anger towards former slaveholders is intensified after the assassination of Abraham Lincoln, when he vows revenge on the South. His programs strip away the land owned by whites, giving it to former slaves. (See Forty acres and a mule.) Men claiming to represent the government confiscate the material wealth of the South, destroying plantation-owning families. Finally, the former slaves are taught that they are superior to their former owners and should rise up against them. These injustices are the impetuses for the creation of the Klan.

Similar to his statements about The Leopard's Spots, Dixon insists in a "To the reader" prologue that the novel is historical:

I have sought to preserve in this romance both the letter and the spirit of this remarkable period. The men who enact the drama of fierce revenge into which I have woven a double love-story are historical figures. I have merely changed their names without taking a liberty with any essential historic fact.

== Reception ==
The publication of The Clansman caused significant uproar not only in the North, but throughout the South. Thomas Dixon was denounced for renewing old conflicts and glorifying what many thought was an unfortunate part of American history.

When offered membership in the KKK, Dixon reportedly turned it down because, he claimed, he did not agree with the Klan's methods. The Klokard of the Klan, Oscar Haywood, at one point challenged Dixon to a debate over the nature of the Ku Klux Klan.

Despite Dixon's reported claims that he rejected violence except in self-defense, in the book previous to The Clansman in Dixon's trilogy, The Leopard's Spots, the Klan dealt thusly with a black man who had asked a white woman to kiss him:

When the sun rose next morning the lifeless body of Tim Shelby was dangling from a rope tied to the iron rail of the balcony of the court house. His neck was broken and his body was hanging low--scarcely three feet from the ground. His thick lips had been split with a sharp knife and from his teeth hung this placard: "The answer of the Anglo-Saxon race to Negro lips that dare pollute with words the womanhood of the South. K. K. K."

— Thomas Dixon, The Leopard's Spots, Chapter XIX, "The Rally of the Clansmen", p. 150

Dixon's novel is often contraposed with Harriet Beecher Stowe's Uncle Tom's Cabin; Dixon himself described it as a sequel. The character of Gus in The Clansman, who is shown as the worst kind of former slave, going as far as to rape a white woman, is the opposite of the benevolent Uncle Tom, who is portrayed as angelic. The books are also similar for the reactions they stirred up among their readers. Uncle Tom's Cabin was detested and banned throughout the South, while The Clansman was ranted against in Northern papers. Also like Uncle Tom's Cabin, The Clansman reached its greatest audience not through its book form, which sold over 100,000 copies, but through the subsequent play, that had an audience of millions.

In the introduction to a university press edition of the book in 1970, an era of high interest in civil rights, historian Thomas D. Clark wrote:

The first thing to be said in discussing Thomas Dixon, Jr.'s novel, The Clansman is that no person of critical judgment thinks of it as having artistic conception or literary craftsmanship.... [T]he novel opened wider a vein of racial hatred which was to poison further an age already in a social and political upheaval.

== The play ==
In 1915, when Birth of a Nation appeared, The Clansman was best known as a play. Much of the movie is taken from the play, rather than directly from the novel.

Dixon rewrote the novel as a play in order to further publicize his views. "In most cases, Dixon's adaptation of a novel for the stage was merely intended to present his message to a larger audience, for his avowed purpose as a writer was to reach as many people as possible." He enrolled in a correspondence course given by the one-man American School of Playwriting, of William Thompson Price. Price was "the greatest critic of the theater since Aristotle"; Dixon also compares him with Daniel Boone and Henry Clay, adding "The State of Kentucky has given the nation no greater man." Apparently as an advertisement for the school, he reproduced in the program his handwritten thank-you note. (At the time, reproducing handwriting was expensive, and to send a handwritten, as opposed to typed, letter was an indication of special esteem.)

November 11, 1905
My dear Mr. Price,
Thanks for your letter of congratulations. It is for me to thank you for invaluable aid as my instructor in the technique of playwriting.
I learned more from your course in one year than I could have gotten in ten years unaided. It is new, not found in books, thorough and practical. The student who neglects this course is missing the opportunity of a life [sic]. I could never have written "The Clansman" without the grasp of its principles. Our association has been an inspiration to me from the first.
Sincerely,
Thomas Dixon Jr.

The contract for the production specified, at Dixon's request, that Dixon would pay half the cost of the production, and have half ownership. He chose the cast and had a "secret power in the...management of the company". "The production of the play became the most fascinating adventure on which I had ever embarked. I lived in a dream world with dream people. I never worked so hard or so happily in my life. Work was play, thrilling, glorious, inspiring play."

Four horses in Klan costumes "raced across the stage in a climax. The horses were ridden in the streets as advertising."

=== Reception ===
In Montgomery, Alabama, and Macon, Georgia, the play was banned. The next day the Washington Post, in an editorial, called for the same to be done in Washington, saying the play was abominable, stupid, and misleading:

The play does not possess even the merit of historic truth. It is as false as "Uncle Tom's Cabin" and a hundred times more wicked, for it excites the passions and prejudices of the dominant class at the expense of the defenseless minority. We can imagine no circumstances under which its production would be useful or wholesome, since it disgusts the judicious and the well-informed, and exerts an influence only upon the ignorant, the credulous, and the ill disposed. But in the present condition of the public mind at [sic] the South it is a firebrand, a counsel of barbarity, in fact, a crime.

In an effort to prevent a performance in Washington, D.C., a group of pastors appealed to President Theodore Roosevelt to intercede on their behalf.

In Philadelphia, the play was banned after it opened by Mayor Weaver, who said that "the tendency of the play is to produce racial hatred". At the opening rotten eggs were thrown at the actors.

The play, despite these protests, was extremely popular in the South. It opened with a huge premiere in Norfolk, Virginia, and drew record-breaking audiences in Columbia, South Carolina, and In fact, the vast majority of news stories about The Clansman have to do with the play, not the novel.

In Bainbridge, Georgia, a black man was lynched shortly after presentation of the play in October, 1905. A newspaper article reported it under the title: "Lynching Laid to 'The Clansman'. Georgia Mob, Wrought Up by Dixon's Story, Hangs Negro Murderer." "The feeling against negroes, never kindly, has been embittered by the Dixon play, following which stories of negroes' depredations during the reconstruction period have been revived, and whites have been wrought up to a high tension."

According to news stories, the "mob" which lynched three negroes in Springfield, Missouri in April, 1906, "seemed filled with the spirit of 'The Clansman', which created such a strong anti-negro feeling here six weeks ago." Dixon called this attribution "the acme of absurdity", claiming that the play had reduced lynchings. The lynching in Springfield, he opined, "was caused by the commission of a crime by negroes—a crime so horrible and revolting to every instinct of white manhood that a whole community went mad with rage for justice, swift and terrible. Such things have happened in the south before and they will happen again so long as such crimes are committed by negroes."

The play had an opulent 60-page program, with pictures, sold at the high price of 50¢ when a newspaper cost 5¢. It included "A Portrait and Sketch of the Author", and "Mr. Dixon's Famous Articles on 'The Future of the Negro', 'The Story of the Ku Klux Klan', and 'What Our Nation owes to the Klan'". The play, being concerned with the KKK and Reconstruction, is adapted in the second half of The Birth of a Nation. According to Professor Russell Merritt, key differences between the play and film are that Dixon was more sympathetic to Southerners' pursuing education and modern professions, whereas Griffith stressed ownership of plantations.

A four-page program of a traveling production, held by the Abraham Lincoln Presidential Library in Springfield, Illinois, tells us that "Hundreds [were] turned away at every performance since the memorable opening in Norfolk, VA., Sept, 22, 1905".

The play was not published until 2007. A scholar says it was not only not published, it was not printed, but with so many involved in the production — two companies were touring simultaneously — copies had to be printed for internal use. Two such copies are known, one in the Library of Congress, the other in the Cortland Free Library.

== Rebirth of the Klan ==
Thomas Dixon's novel did not have the immediate effect of causing the recreation of the Ku Klux Klan. Neither did the subsequent play. The release of the movie The Birth of a Nation in 1915 finally let Dixon's work reach an audience large enough to start the resurrection of the Klan.

One of the images most commonly associated with the Klan, that of a burning Latin cross, was actually taken from The Clansman, but was not used by the original Klan. Dixon, who had Scottish ancestry, drew upon the Scottish tradition of the Crann Tara, a burning cross used to call clan members to arms, as inspiration for the depiction of cross burning. The Klan's white robes are also an invention of Dixon, and he protested their appropriation of the "livery" he created.

== Archival material ==
- An autograph manuscript is held by the Free Library of Philadelphia.
- Corrected galley proofs are held by the Indiana University Library.
- A mimeographed 1909 typescript of the play is held by the Van Pelt Library, University of Pennsylvania.
- A 131-page printed version of the play, dated 1905, is held by the Cortland Free Library
