= The Leopard's Spots =

First novel of Thomas Dixon's Ku Klux Klan trilogy

The Leopard's Spots: A Romance of the White Man's Burden - 1865-1900
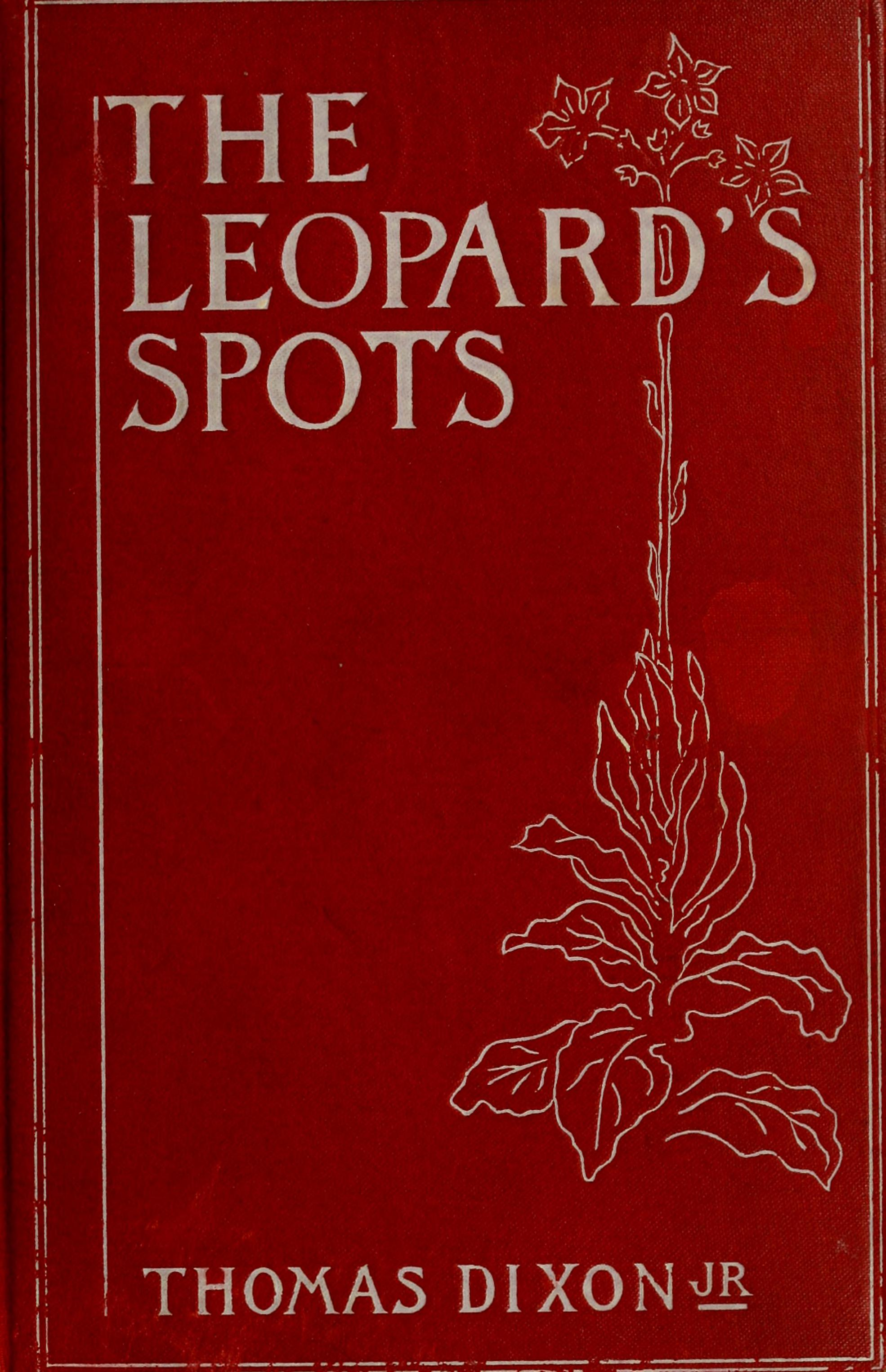
- First edition cover
- Author: Thomas Dixon
- Illustrator: C. D. Williams
- Language: English
- Genre: Novel
- Publisher: Doubleday, Page & Co.
- Publication date: 1902
- Publication place: United States
- Media type: Print
- OCLC: 12852953

The Leopard's Spots: A Romance of the White Man's Burden—1865–1900 is the first novel of Thomas Dixon's Reconstruction trilogy, and was followed by The Clansman: A Historical Romance of the Ku Klux Klan (1905), and The Traitor: A Story of the Fall of the Invisible Empire (1907). In the novel, published in 1902, Dixon offers an account of Reconstruction in which he portrays a Reconstruction leader (and former slave driver), Northern carpetbaggers, and emancipated slaves as the villains; Ku Klux Klan members are anti-heroes. While the playbills and program for The Birth of a Nation claimed The Leopard's Spots as a source in addition to The Clansman, recent scholars do not accept this.

The first half of a passage from the Book of Jeremiah (13:23) is included on the title page: "Can the Ethiopian change his skin, or the leopard his spots?" While the full passage is about evildoers refusing to turn away from evil to good, the title conveys the idea that, as leopards could not change their spots, people of African origin could not change what Dixon, as a racist and white supremacist, viewed as inherently negative character traits.

== A reply to Uncle Tom's Cabin ==
Harriet Beecher Stowe's landmark novel of 1852, Uncle Tom's Cabin; or, Life Among the Lowly, had a profound effect on attitudes toward African Americans and slavery in the U.S. and is said to have "helped lay the groundwork for the Civil War". It was still widely read fifty years after its publication. According to Dixon, whose contact with the work was a dramatized version, Stowe "grossly misrepresent[ed]" the American South, and he felt her sympathetic portrayal of African Americans demanded revision. So as to make it clear he is answering Stowe, he presents his version of Stowe's characters, using Stowe's character names.

== Characters ==
=== Leading characters of the story (as listed in the book) ===
- Charles Gaston – A man who dreams of making it to the Governor's Mansion
- Sallie Worth – A daughter of the old-fashioned South
- Gen. Daniel Worth – Her father
- Mrs. Worth – Sallie's mother
- The Rev. John Durham – A preacher who threw his life away
- Mrs. Durham – Of the Southern Army that never surrendered
- Tom Camp – A one-legged Confederate soldier
- Flora – Tom's little daughter
- Simon Legree – Ex-slave driver and Reconstruction leader
- Allan Mcleod – A scalawag
- Hon. Everett Lowell – Member of Congress from Boston
- Helen Lowell – His daughter
- Miss Susan Walker – A maiden of Boston
- Major Stuart Dameron – Chief of the Ku Klux Klan
- Hose Norman – A dare-devil poor white man
- Nelse – A black hero of the old régime
- Aunt Eve – His wife – "a respectable woman."
- Hon. Tim Sheldby – Political boss of the new era
- Hon. Pete Sawyer – Sold seven times, got the money once
- George Harris Jr. – An Educated Negro, son of Eliza
- Dick – An unsolved riddle

=== Using names of characters in Uncle Tom's Cabin ===
- Simon Legree – In Uncle Tom's Cabin; a cruel master, hateful of religion, superstitious, and determined to “break” Tom
- Tom Camp – In Stowe's novel Tom (no last name) is a humble African-American slave and "Mr. Shelby's best hand". Dixon's Tom is a former Confederate soldier, a poor white Christian whose family is victimized by black men.
- Hon. Tim Shelby – Political boss. In Uncle Tom's Cabin Arthur Shelby was Tom's owner, who "sold him South". His son George Shelby is also a character.
- George Harris Jr. – An educated negro

== Dramatization ==
A dramatization by Dixon, with the same title, was produced in New York in 1913.
