= Letter of thanks =

Letter sent expressing appreciation

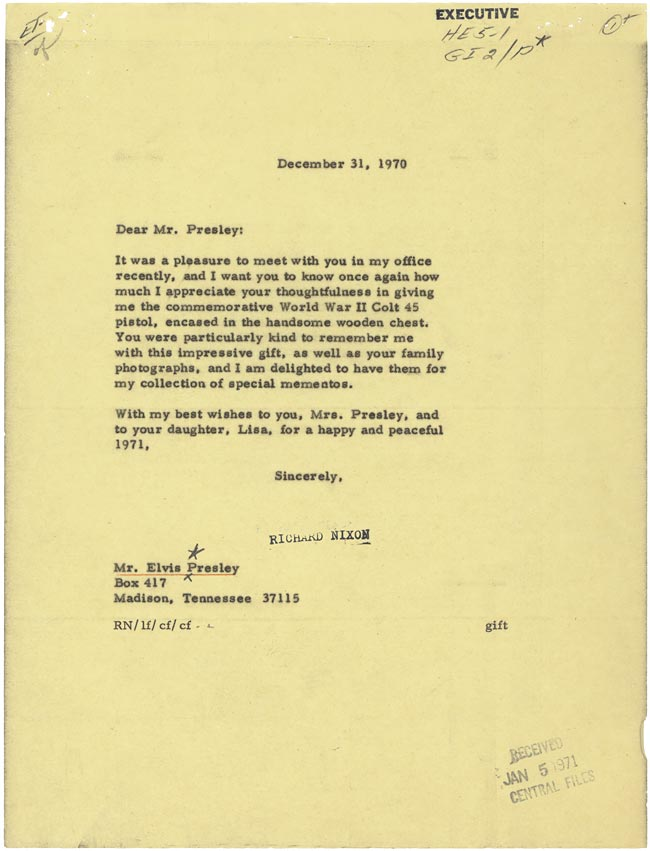
A letter of thanks from Richard Nixon to Elvis Presley

A letter of thanks, letter of gratitude, thank you card, or thank you letter is a letter or greetings card that is used when one person/party wishes to express appreciation to another. They are frequently sent after an event (a birthday party, a religious festival or holiday) and especially when a gift has been received. Personal thank-you letters and cards are often hand-written and the addressee is typically a friend, acquaintance or relative. Letters of gratitude are usually written as formal business letters, either to a client, a supplier, an employer (or prospective employer after an interview) or an employee as part of creating an engaged workforce.

== Benefits ==
Some psychological research indicates that expressing gratitude by writing such letters can have emotional benefits, but this does not apply to all circumstances. News media have covered the tradition of handwritten letters of thanks from a cultural perspective, suggesting in particular that the extra effort represented by handwriting (as opposed to text messaging, for example) makes these letters more emotionally significant for sender and recipient alike.
