= Charles Cooper Tedder =

American politician (1971-1973)

Mayor of Florence, South Carolina
- In office 1971-1983
- Preceded by: David H. McLeod
- Succeeded by: Joe W. Pearce, Jr.

Personal details
- Born: August 27, 19, 1929 Sardis, Florence County, South Carolina, US
- Died: September 13, 1993 (aged 63–64) Florence, South Carolina, US

Charles Cooper Tedder (August 27, 1929 – September 13, 1993) was the mayor of Florence, South Carolina from mid-1971 to 1983.

== Career ==
Charles C. Tedder served in the Marines as a 2nd Lieutenant, and was deployed during the Korean War.

Tedder served as mayor of Florence, South Carolina from 1971 to 1983. He succeeded David H. McLeod as mayor mid-1971. During his time as mayor, he engaged in downtown revitalization efforts, transportation, and trash improvements. Additional projects include the remodeling of two Florence County hangars, Social Security seminars, proclaiming a "Head Start Week" to support the Head Start program, and industrial development efforts across Florence.

During his term as mayor in 1973, he wrote a letter to the South Carolina Federation of Women's and Girls' clubs, greeting the organization and their members in honor of an annual conference being held in Florence, South Carolina.

In 1975, the Delta Tau chapter of the Kappa Alpha Order at Francis Marion University involved mayor Tedder in a philanthropic event, playfully "kidnapping" him to gather donations as "ransom," which were then donated to their local Salvation Army. He attended other fraternity events, giving a speech in April 1976 at the annual southeastern regional meeting of the Phi Beta Sigma fraternity in Florence, S.C.

He was succeeded by Joe W. Pearce Jr. mid-1983.

== Death ==
Tedder died due to complications related to cancer on September 13, 1993.
