= Lost Cause of the Confederacy =

Negationist myth of the American Civil War

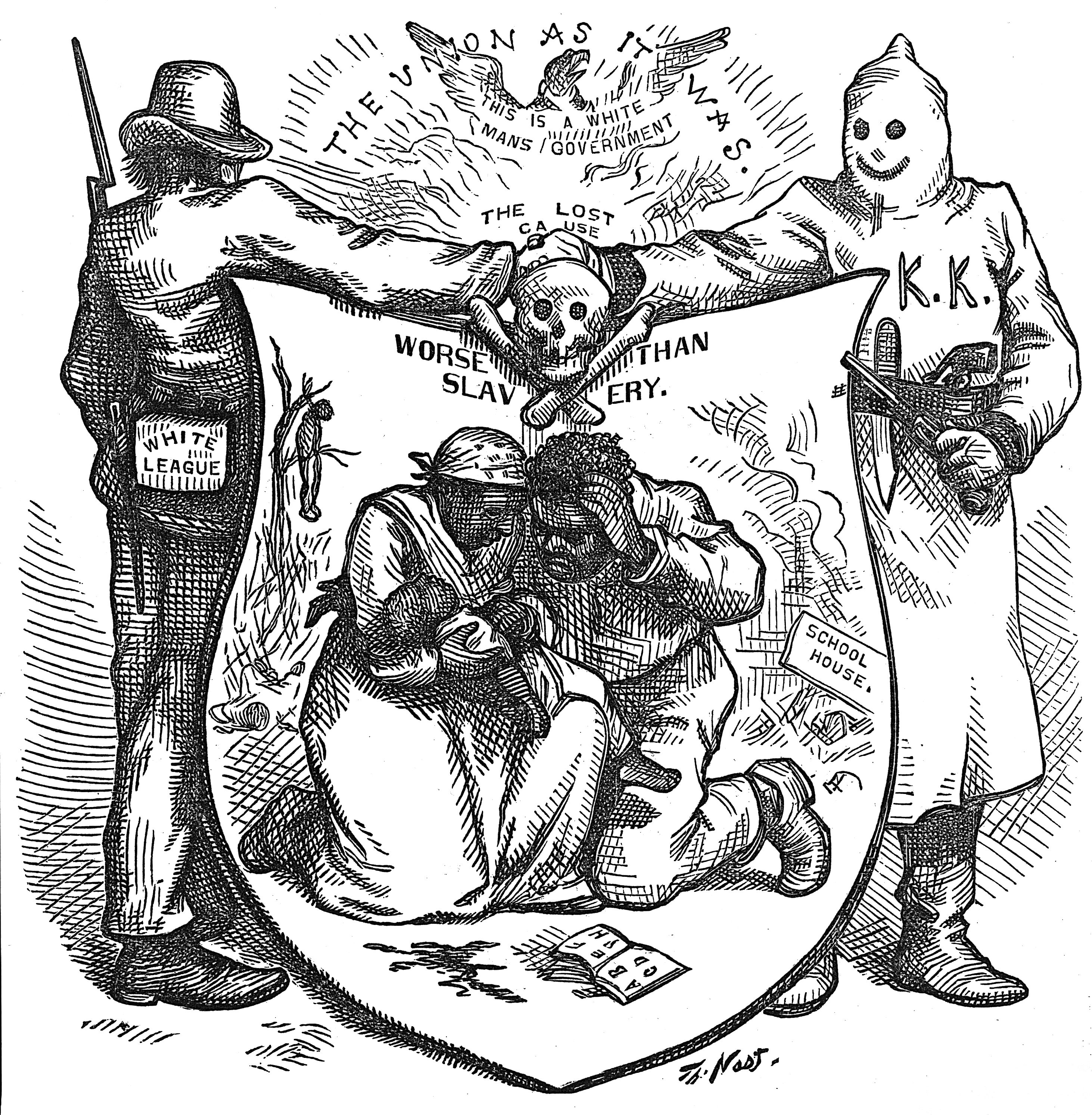
1874 cartoon showing a Klansman and a member of the White League shaking hands over scenes of anti-black violence. Above them, a phoenix rises from the ashes of the "lost cause", representing the resurgence of white supremacy after the defeat of the Confederacy.

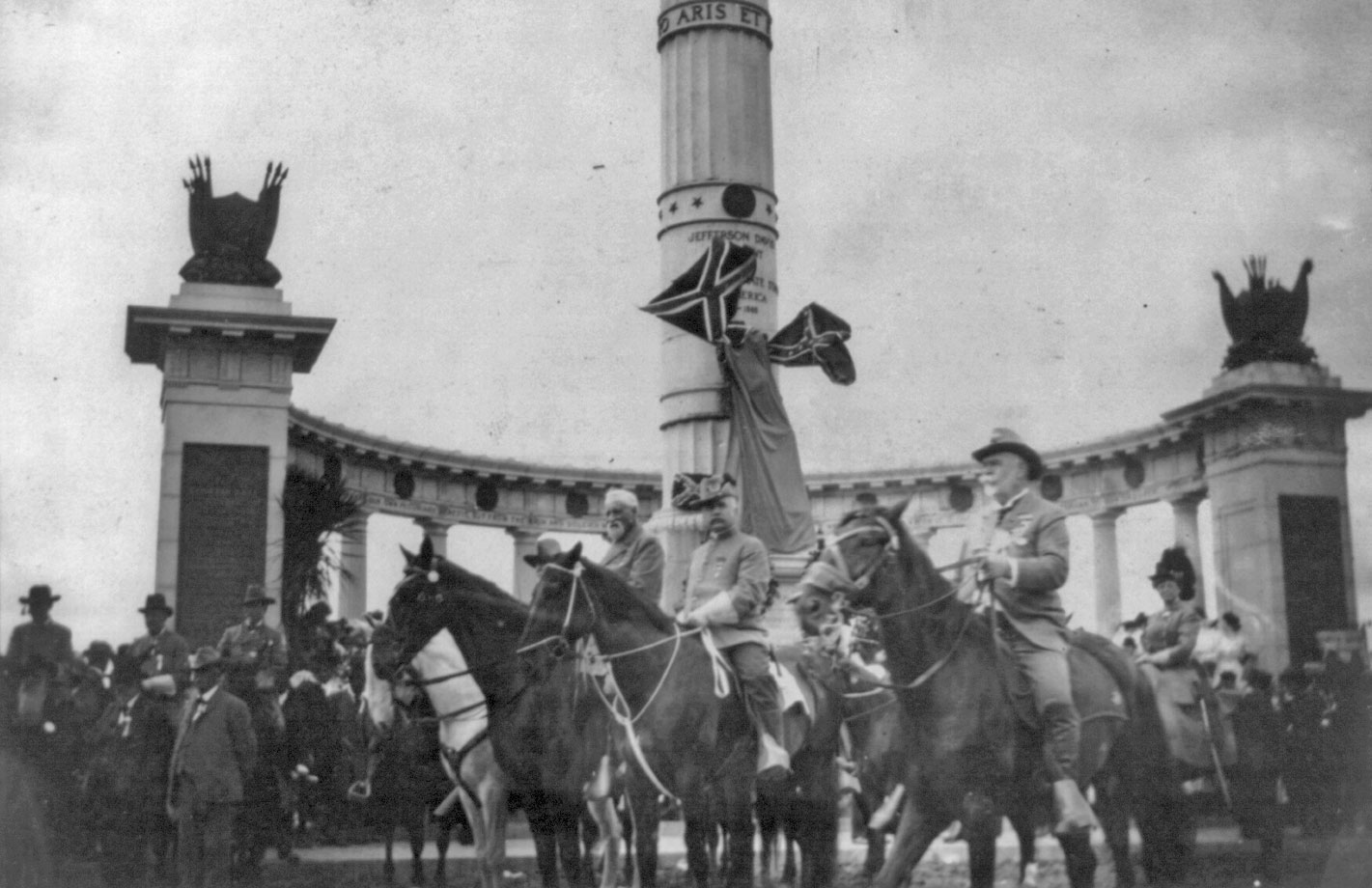
Custis Lee (1832–1913) rides on horseback in front of the Jefferson Davis Memorial in Richmond, Virginia, on June 3, 1907, reviewing the Confederate Reunion Parade.

Mississippi Secession Convention (1861)

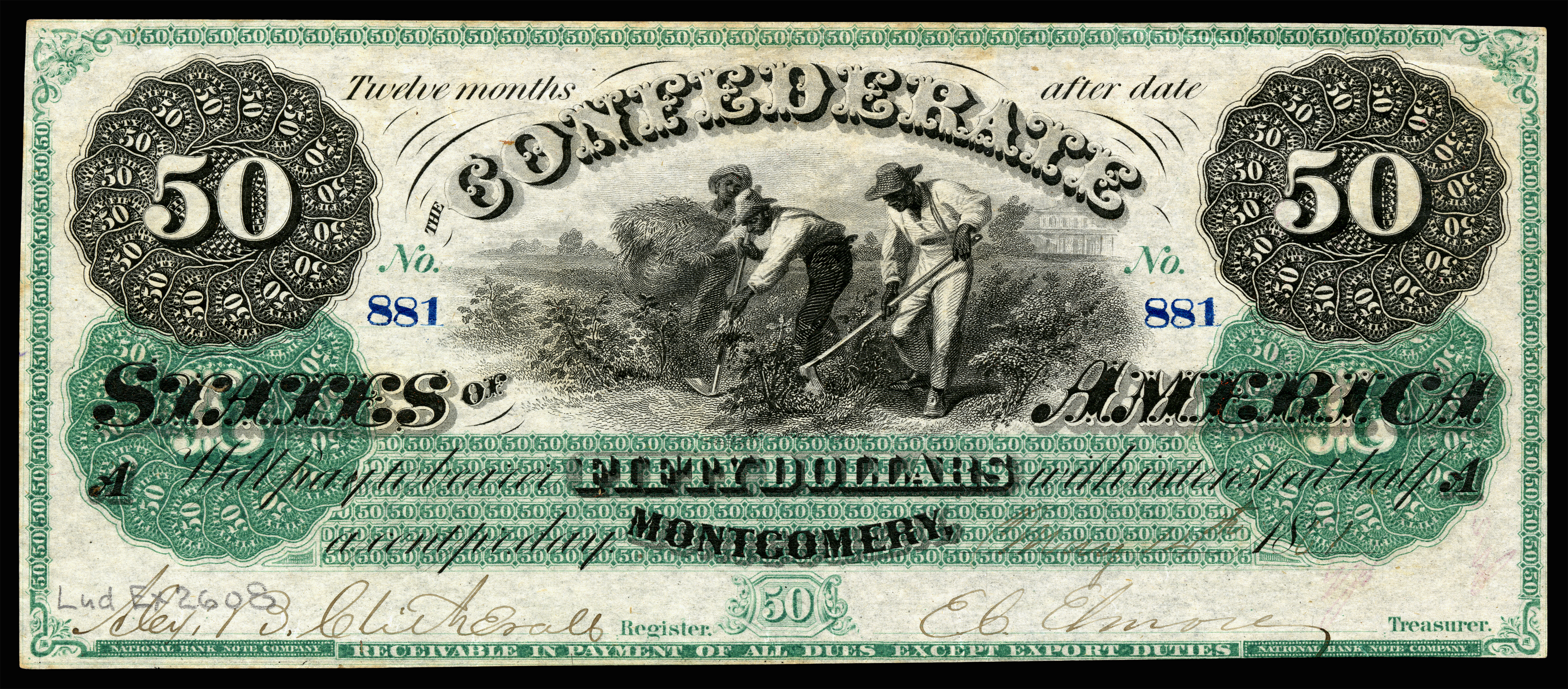
Confederate $50 bill depicting slaves working in a field

The Lost Cause of the Confederacy, also known as the Lost Cause Myth or simply as the Lost Cause, is an American pseudohistorical and historical negationist myth that argues the mission, purpose, or goals of the Confederate States during the American Civil War were morally just, heroic, and not centered on maintaining slavery. First articulated in 1866, it has continued to influence racism, gender roles, and religious attitudes in the Southern United States into the 21st century.

The Lost Cause reached the height of its popularity at the turn of the 20th century, when proponents memorialized Confederate veterans during the final years of their lives. It reached another high level of popularity during the civil rights movement of the 1950s and 1960s in reaction to growing public support for racial equality. Through actions such as building prominent Confederate monuments and writing history textbooks, Lost Cause organizations (including the United Daughters of the Confederacy and Sons of Confederate Veterans) sought to ensure that Southern whites would know what they called the "true" narrative of the Civil War and would continue to support white supremacist policies such as Jim Crow laws. White supremacy is a central feature of the Lost Cause narrative.

== Origin of the term ==
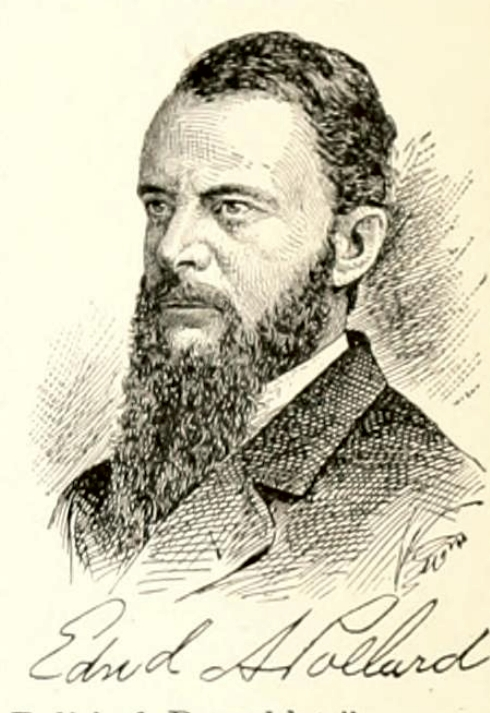
Edward A. Pollard, author of the 1866 book The Lost Cause

The term "Lost Cause" was sometimes applied by writers observing the Confederate war effort against the larger industrial might of the North. It appeared in the title of an 1866 book by the Virginian journalist Edward A. Pollard, The Lost Cause: A New Southern History of the War of the Confederates. According to Pollard, the term was inserted at the request of his publisher in New York City, who feared that Pollard's original title, History of the War, would not be catchy enough to sell books. The "Lost Cause" title sold well.

Pollard promoted many of the themes of the Lost Cause such as the claim that states' rights were the cause of the war and that Southerners were forced to defend themselves against Northern aggression. He dismissed the role of slavery in starting the war and understated the cruelty of American slavery, even promoting it as a way of improving the lives of Africans. Pollard's revisionist history continues to have an effect on how slavery and the Civil War are taught in the United States. For example, in 1866 Pollard wrote:

We shall not enter upon the discussion of the moral question of slavery. But we may suggest a doubt here whether that odious term "slavery", which has been so long imposed, by the exaggeration of Northern writers, upon the judgement and sympathies of the world, is properly applied to that system of servitude in the South, which was really the mildest in the world; which did not rest on acts of debasement and disenfranchisement, but elevated the African, and was in the interest of human improvement; and which, by the law of the land, protected the negro in life and limb, and in many personal rights, and, by the practice of the system, bestowed upon him a sum of individual indulgences, which made him altogether the most striking type in the world of cheerfulness and contentment.

Pollard in The Lost Cause and its sequel The Lost Cause Regained drew inspiration from John Milton's Paradise Lost with the intention of portraying the pre-war South as a "paradise" that was lost in its defeat.

== Tenets ==
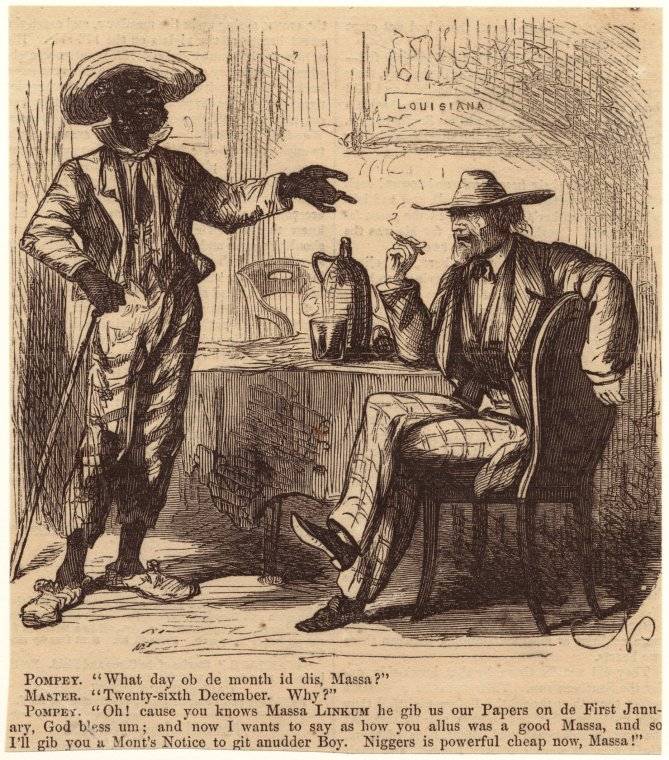
The Lost Cause ideology includes fallacies about the relationships between slaves and masters.

=== Unimportance of slavery ===
The movement that took The Lost Cause for its name had multiple origins, but its unifying contention was that slavery was not the primary cause of the Civil War and would have naturally perished. This narrative denies or minimizes the explanatory statements and constitutions published by the seceding states—for example, the wartime writings and speeches of CSA vice president Alexander Stephens and especially his Cornerstone Speech. Lost Cause historians instead favor the more moderate postwar views of Confederate leaders.

Confederate president Jefferson Davis wrote about the place of the South's enslaved African Americans in his The Rise and Fall of the Confederate Government (1881):

[The negro soldiers'] servile instincts rendered them contented with their lot, and their patient toil blessed the land of their abode with unmeasured riches. Their strong local and personal attachment secured faithful service [...] Never was there happier dependence of labor and capital on each other. The tempter came, like the serpent of Eden, and decoyed them with the magic word of "freedom" [...] He put arms in their hands, and trained their humble but emotional natures to deeds of violence and bloodshed, and sent them out to devastate their benefactors.

The Lost Cause narrative claims that it was merely a matter of time before the South would have given up slavery by its own choice and that it was the trouble-making abolitionists who manufactured disagreement between the regions. Enslaved African Americans were characterized as faithful and happy.

The Lost Cause's assertion that any state had the right to secede was strongly denied in the North. Lost Cause arguments universally portray slavery as more benevolent than cruel.

=== States' rights ===
The Lost Cause argument stresses secession as a defense against a Northern threat to a Southern way of life and declares that this threat violated the states' rights guaranteed by the Constitution of the United States and its Tenth Amendment.

Southern states argued against states' rights when it benefited them in the context of fugitive slave laws. For example, Texas challenged some northern states having the right to protect fugitive slaves, with the argument that this would make the institution null once a particular slave had crossed into a free state. The question was pivotal in the case of Dred Scott v. Sandford.

=== Chivalric tradition ===
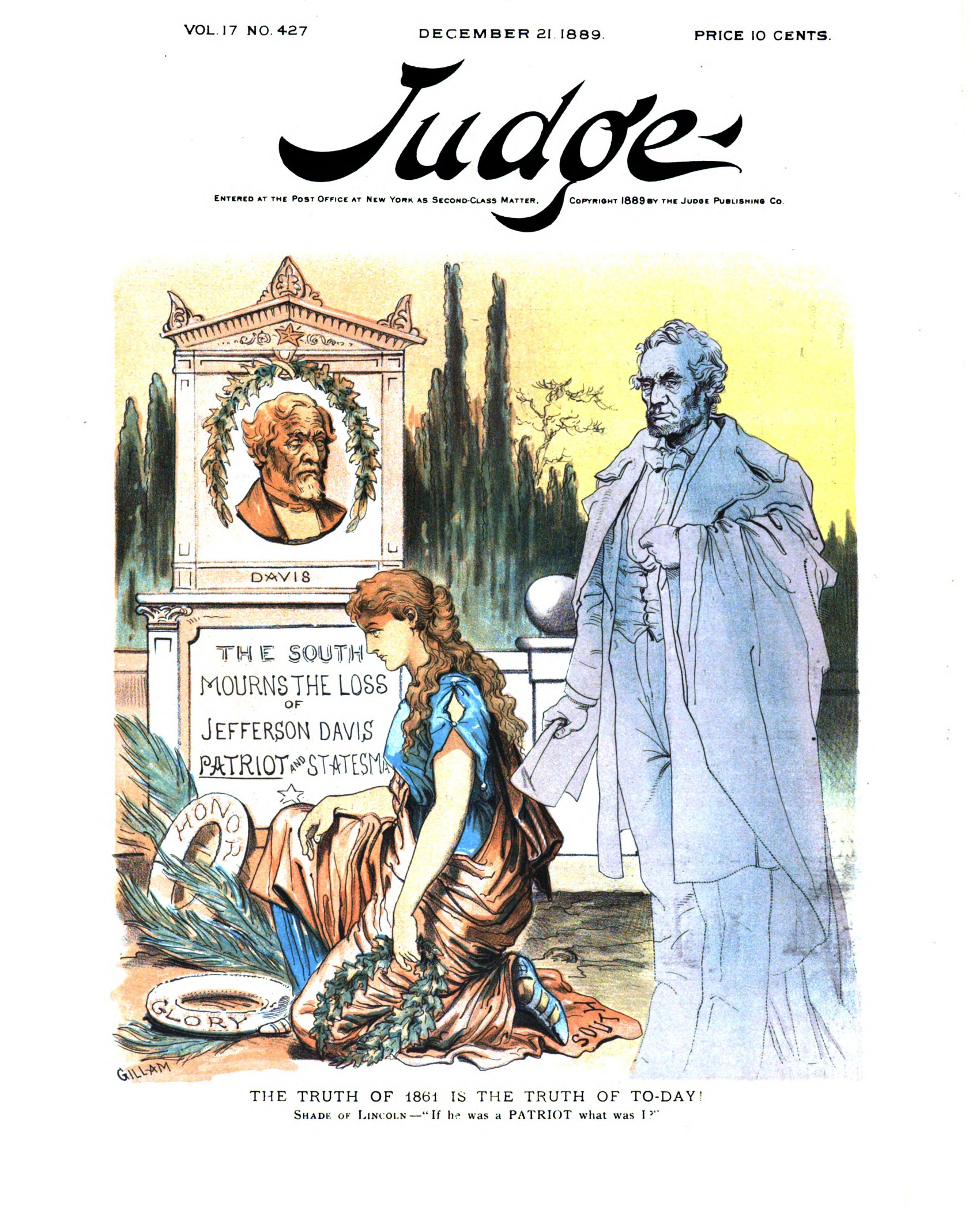
Political cartoon from the northern magazine Judge in 1889 criticizing the characterization of the recently deceased Jefferson Davis as a "patriot and statesman" as disrespectful to the memory of Abraham Lincoln

Lost Cause advocates point to a perceived chivalric tradition of the South as evidence for the Confederate States of America's cultural and martial superiority to the North, relying on nationalistic narratives of the fanciful Southern Cavalier descended from the English Royalists or the Norman knights of William the Conqueror.

Lost Cause rhetoric idealized the South as a land of "grace and gentility" where planter aristocrats were indulgent of their cheerful slaves and its manhood had great courage. Whites and blacks are portrayed as joined in support of the South's benevolent and gracious civilization, superior to that of the North. The Confederate soldier is romanticized as steadfast, dashing, and heroic. Lost Cause doctrine holds that secession is a right granted by the Constitution; therefore, those who defend it are not traitors. Southern military leaders are depicted in Lost Cause hagiography as virtual saints, with Robert E. Lee occupying the preeminent place as a Christ-like figure.

=== Undefeated South ===
Lost Cause advocates try to rationalize the Confederate military defeat with the assertion that the South had not actually been defeated; rather, it had been unfairly overcome by the massive manpower and resources of the deceitful Yankees. Contradictorily, they also maintain that the South would have won the war if it had prevailed in the Battle of Gettysburg, and that it lost because of Stonewall Jackson's death in 1863 and the failure of Lieutenant General James Longstreet.

In explaining Confederate defeat, an assertion is made that the main factor was not qualitative inferiority in leadership or fighting ability but the massive quantitative superiority of the Yankee industrial machine. At the peak of troop strength in 1863, Union soldiers outnumbered Confederate soldiers by over two to one, and the Union had three times the bank deposits of the Confederacy.

In its mythology and peculiarly Southern iconography, Confederate generals are characterized as morally flawless, deeply religious, and saintly or Christ-like.

== African American opposition to Lost Cause monuments ==
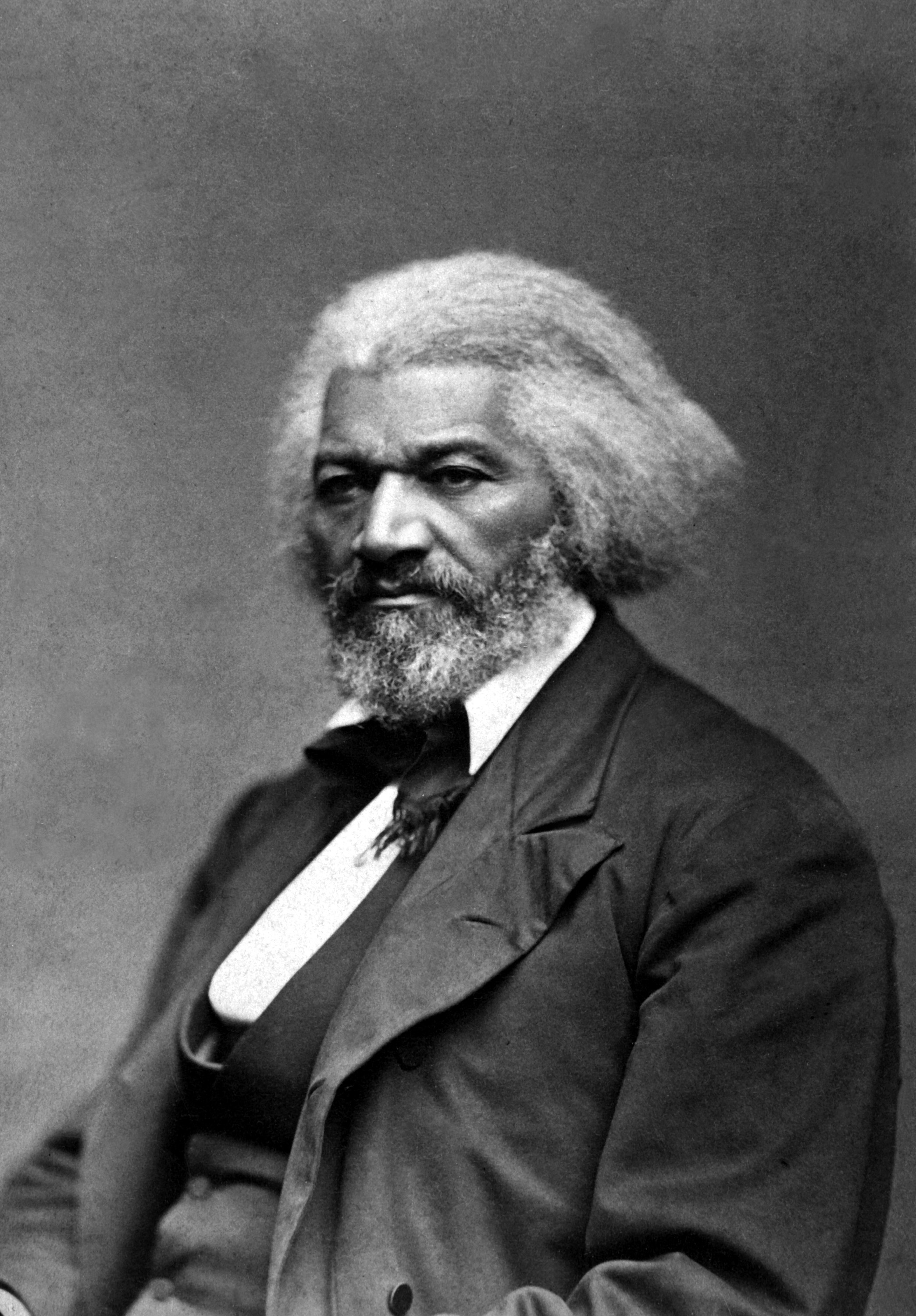
Frederick Douglass (c. 1879) opposed the erection of Confederate monuments.

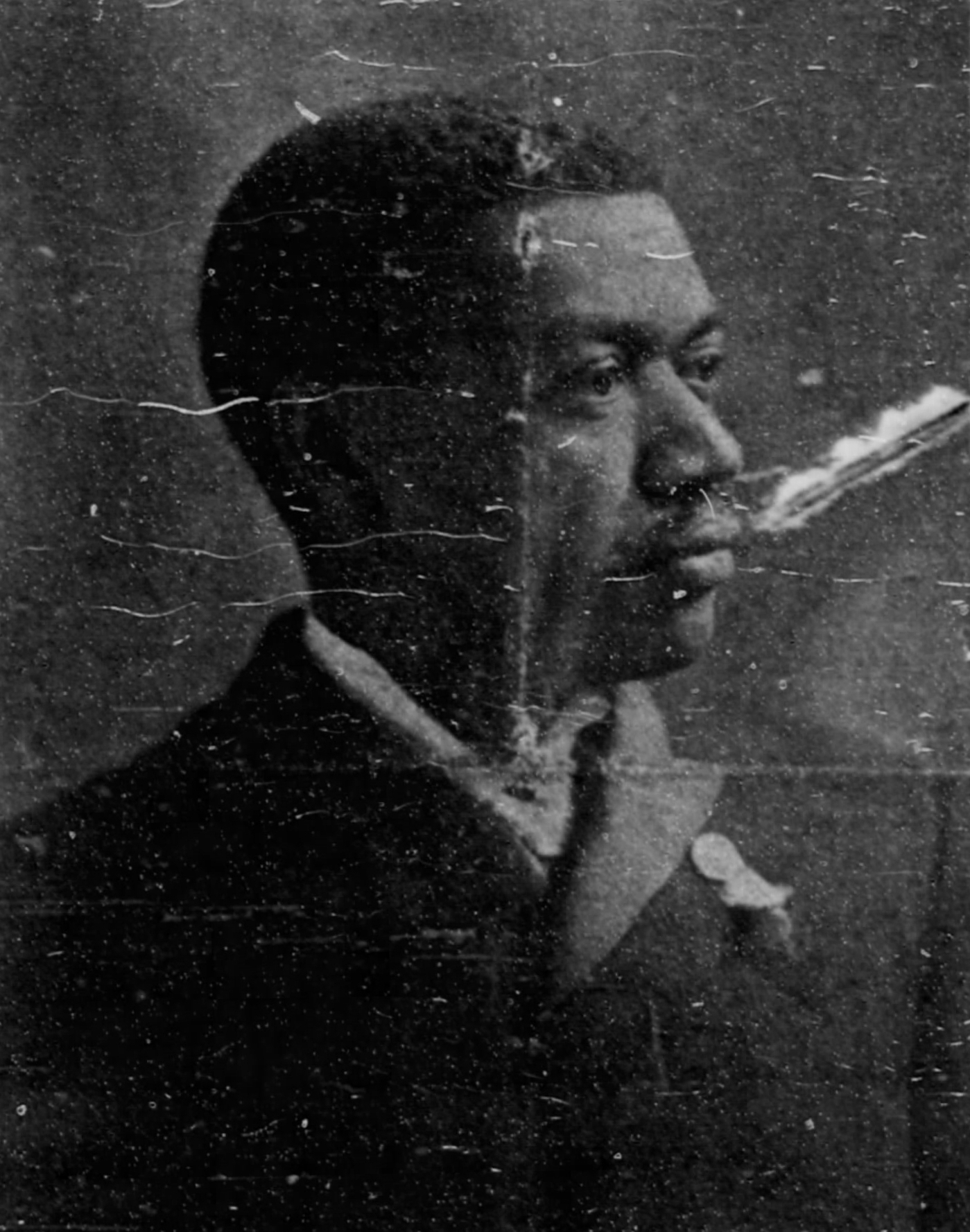
John Mitchell Jr. opposed the erection of a Robert E. Lee monument in Richmond, Virginia.

Stories of happy slaves and benevolent slave owners became propaganda to defend slavery and to explain Southern slavery to Northerners. The United Daughters of the Confederacy had a Faithful Slave Memorial Committee and erected the Heyward Shepherd monument in Harpers Ferry, West Virginia.

After the Civil War, white Southerners wanted to portray the South positively by erecting Confederate monuments to memorialize Confederate generals in support of the false narrative that Confederates had fought the war to preserve states' rights and not slavery. African Americans such as 19th-century civil rights activist Frederick Douglass opposed the erection of Confederate memorials.

In 1870, Douglass wrote: "Monuments to the 'lost cause' will prove monuments of folly [...] in the memories of a wicked rebellion which they must necessarily perpetuate [...] It is a needless record of stupidity and wrong."

On May 30, 1871, during the national celebration of Memorial Day at the tomb of the unknown soldier in Arlington National Cemetery in Virginia, Douglass delivered a speech about slavery as the meaning and cause of the Civil War. He said: "We are sometimes asked, in the name of patriotism, to forget the merits of this fearful struggle, and to remember, with equal admiration, those who struck at the nation's life, and those who struck to save it—those who fought for slavery, and those who fought for liberty and justice. I am no minister of malice [...] I would not repel the repentant, but may [...] my tongue cleave to the roof of my mouth, if I forget the difference between the parties to that [...] bloody conflict."

John Mitchell Jr. was an African American newspaper editor, politician, banker, and civil rights activist in the 19th and early 20th centuries from Richmond, Virginia, who advocated against the erection of a Robert E. Lee monument there. He tried to block its funding, but a white conservative majority prevailed. On May 29, 1890, the statue was unveiled during a celebration and Mitchell covered the event in the Richmond Planet. He wrote: "This glorification of States Rights Doctrine—the right of secession, and the honoring of men who represented that cause [...] fosters in the Republic, the spirit of Rebellion and will ultimately result in the handing down to generations unborn a legacy of treason and blood."

W. E. B. Du Bois, a civil rights activist and Pan-Africanist, also spoke out against Lost Cause memorials. In 1931, in the official magazine for the NAACP, The Crisis, he criticized the disingenuous inscriptions on Civil War monuments, writing that the "plain truth of the matter would be an inscription something like this: 'sacred to the memory of those who fought to Perpetuate Human Slavery'".

On January 3, 1966, Sammy Younge Jr. was murdered in Tuskegee, Alabama, two years after the passage of the Civil Rights Act of 1964, which had made segregation of public places illegal. He stopped to use a public restroom at a gas station, and the white store owner, Marvin Segrest, told him to use the segregated restroom. He refused and told Segrest the Civil Rights Act made segregated facilities illegal. They argued, and Segrest shot Younge in the head. Segrest was not found guilty in court, which prompted Black students in Tuskegee, Alabama, to protest at the Tuskegee Confederate Monument. The monument was defaced, including with the phrase "Black Power". Protesters also unsuccessfully tried to pull it down with a rope and chain. The grounds are owned by the United Daughters of the Confederacy.

=== Twenty-first century removals ===
On the night of August 20, 2018, at the University of North Carolina at Chapel Hill in North Carolina, hundreds of protesters gathered at "Silent Sam", a one-hundred-year-old Confederate Monument, and demanded its removal. By 9:30 p.m., they pulled down the statue with a rope. The gathering was supported by the actions of a previous student named Maya Little, when in April, Little protested the monument by pouring blood and paint on it. Some residents in North Carolina believe Confederate monuments have connections to white supremacy.

In 2020, during the George Floyd protests, several Confederate monuments were defaced with graffiti. From 2020 to 2021 in Virginia, many Confederate monuments were removed from Monument Avenue. The SPLC claim that in 2020 at least 160 Confederate symbols were moved from public spaces.

Lost Cause monuments continue to evoke conversations about racial injustice in the United States. They shift the memory of the Civil War away from themes of slavery and emancipation to states' rights with a romanticized version of slavery and the Civil War.

== History ==
=== Nineteenth century ===
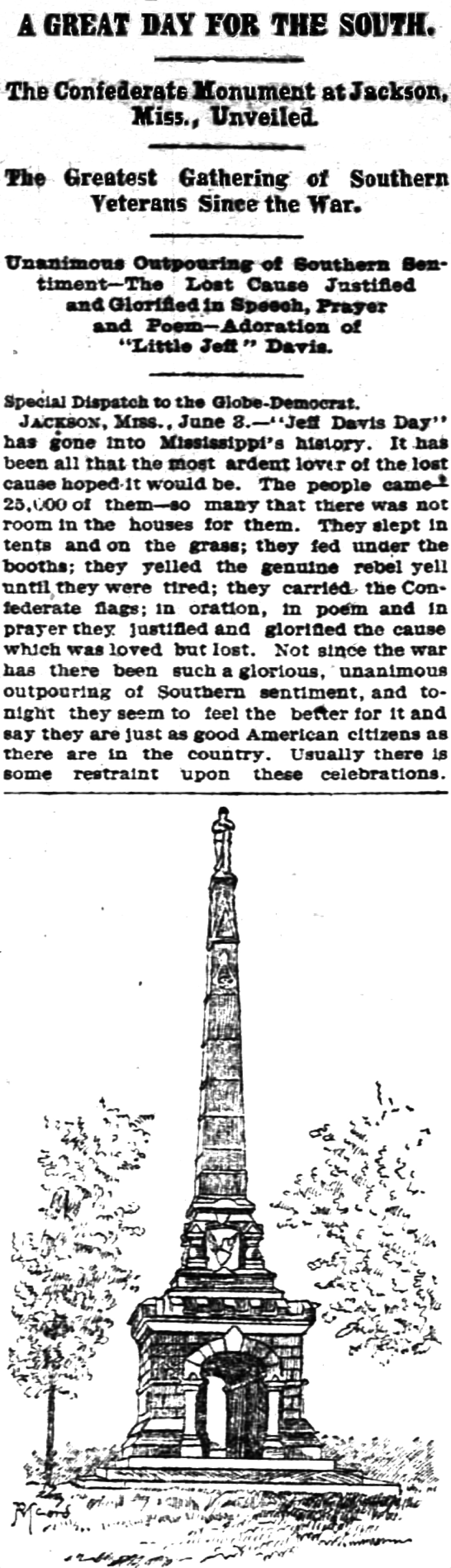
A St. Louis Globe-Democrat article concerning the dedication of a Jackson, Mississippi, monument to Confederate soldiers in June 1891 has "Lost Cause" in its headline.

The defeat of the Confederacy devastated many white Southerners economically, emotionally, and psychologically. Before the war, many believed that their rich military tradition would avail them in the forthcoming conflict. Many sought consolation in attributing their loss to factors beyond their control, such as physical size and overwhelming brute force.

The University of Virginia professor Gary W. Gallagher wrote:

The architects of the Lost Cause acted from various motives. They collectively sought to justify their own actions and allow themselves and other former Confederates to find something positive in all-encompassing failure. They also wanted to provide their children and future generations of white Southerners with a "correct" narrative of the war.

Yale University history professor Rollin G. Osterweis summarizes the content that pervaded Lost Cause writings:

The Legend of the Lost Cause began as mostly a literary expression of the despair of a bitter, defeated people over a lost identity. It was a landscape dotted with figures drawn mainly out of the past: the chivalric planter; the magnolia-scented Southern belle; the good, gray Confederate veteran, once a knight of the field and saddle; and obliging old Uncle Remus. All these, while quickly enveloped in a golden haze, became very real to the people of the South, who found the symbols useful in the reconstituting of their shattered civilization. They perpetuated the ideals of the Old South and brought a sense of comfort to the New.

Louisiana State University history professor Gaines Foster wrote in 2013:

Scholars have reached a fair amount of agreement about the role the Lost Cause played in those years, although the scholarship on the Lost Cause, like the memory itself, remains contested. The white South, most agree, dedicated enormous effort to celebrating the leaders and common soldiers of the Confederacy, emphasizing that they had preserved their and the South's honor.

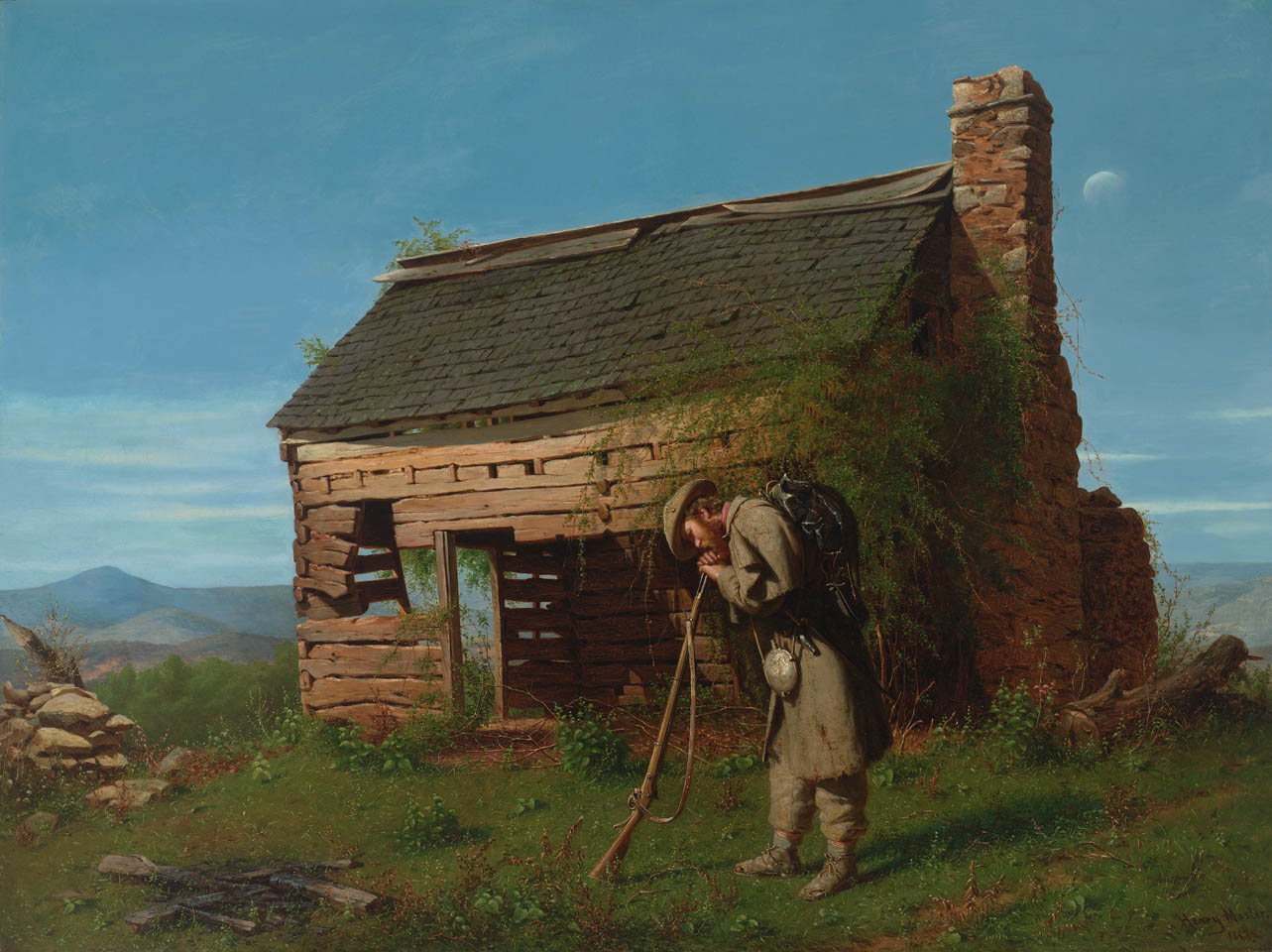
Henry Mosler completed his best known painting, The Lost Cause, three years after the end of the Civil War.

However, it was the articles written by General Jubal A. Early in the 1870s for the Southern Historical Society that firmly established the Lost Cause as a long-lasting literary and cultural phenomenon. The 1881 publication of The Rise and Fall of the Confederate Government by ex-Confederate president Jefferson Davis, a two-volume defense of the Southern cause, provided another important text in the history of the Lost Cause. Davis blamed the enemy for "whatever of bloodshed, of devastation, or shock to republican government has resulted from the war". He charged that the Yankees fought "with a ferocity that disregarded all the laws of civilized warfare". The book remained in print and often served to justify the Southern position and to distance it from slavery.

Early's original inspiration for his views may have come from Confederate General Robert E. Lee. When Lee published his farewell order to the Army of Northern Virginia, he consoled his soldiers by speaking of the "overwhelming resources and numbers" that the Confederate army had fought against. In a letter to Early, Lee requested information about enemy strengths from May 1864 to April 1865, the period in which his army was engaged against Lieutenant General Ulysses S. Grant (the Overland Campaign and the Siege of Petersburg). Lee wrote, "My only object is to transmit, if possible, the truth to posterity, and do justice to our brave Soldiers." In another letter, Lee wanted all "statistics as regards numbers, destruction of private property by the Federal troops, &c." because he intended to demonstrate the discrepancy in strength between the two armies and believed it would "be difficult to get the world to understand the odds against which we fought". Referring to newspaper accounts that accused him of culpability in the loss, he wrote, "I have not thought proper to notice, or even to correct misrepresentations of my words & acts. We shall have to be patient, & suffer for awhile at least [...] At present the public mind is not prepared to receive the truth." All of these themes were made prominent by Early and the Lost Cause writers in the nineteenth century and continued to play an important role throughout the twentieth.

In a November 1868 report, U.S. Army general George Henry Thomas, a Virginian who had fought for the Union in the war, noted efforts made by former Confederates to paint the Confederacy in a positive light:

[T]he greatest efforts made by the defeated insurgents since the close of the war have been to promulgate the idea that the cause of liberty, justice, humanity, equality, and all the calendar of the virtues of freedmen, suffered violence and wrong when the effort for southern independence failed. This is, of course, intended as a species of political cant, whereby the crime of treason might be covered with a counterfeit varnish of patriotism, so that the precipitators of rebellion might go down in history hand in hand with the defenders of the government, thus wiping out with their own hands their own stains.

— George Henry Thomas, November 1868

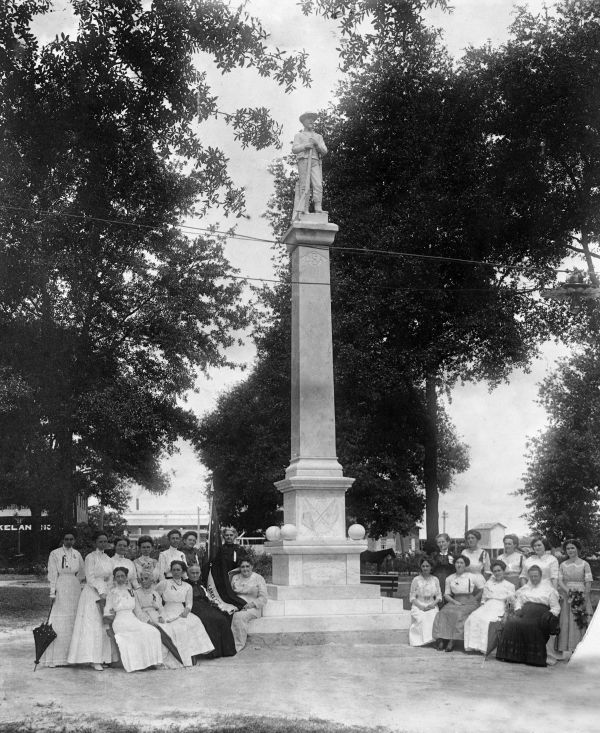
In 1915, members of the United Daughters of the Confederacy gathered around a Confederate monument in Lakeland, Florida.

Memorial associations such as the United Confederate Veterans, the United Daughters of the Confederacy, and Ladies Memorial Associations integrated Lost Cause themes to help white Confederate-sympathizing Southerners cope with the many changes during the era, most significantly Reconstruction. The institutions have lasted to the present, and descendants of Confederate soldiers continue to attend their meetings.

In 1879, John McElroy published Andersonville: A Story of Rebel Military Prisons, which strongly criticized the Confederate treatment of prisoners and implied in the preface that the mythology of the Confederacy was well established, and that criticism of the otherwise-lionized Confederates was met with disdain:

I know that what is contained herein will be bitterly denied. I am prepared for this. In my boyhood I witnessed the savagery of the Slavery agitation – in my youth I felt the fierceness of the hatred directed against all those who stood by the Nation. I know that hell hath no fury like the vindictiveness of those who are hurt by the truth being told of them.

In the early 20th century, many Lost Cause catechisms were published for southern children. The U.D.C. Catechism for Children was published in 1904 for a Texas chapter of the United Daughters of the Confederacy and republished in Staunton, Virginia. It promoted the Lost Cause in a question-and-answer format intended for rote memorization. The Confederate Catechism has a similar format, with passages glorifying the Children of the Confederacy organization.

In 1907, Hunter Holmes McGuire, physician of Confederate general Stonewall Jackson, published in a book papers sponsored by the Grand Camp of Confederate Veterans of Virginia, supporting the Lost Cause tenets that "slavery [was] not the cause of the war" and that "the North [was] the aggressor in bringing on the war". The book quickly sold out and a second edition was printed.

The German historian Wolfgang Schivelbusch compared the Lost Cause mythology embraced by the South after the Civil War to the "lost cause" of the ideals held by such Northern intellectuals as Ralph Waldo Emerson, Herman Melville, Henry Adams, and Henry James, who had strived to establish an American humanism free of mythologizing and were disillusioned that the Union victory was followed by the materialism of Gilded Age America.

==== Reunification of North and South ====
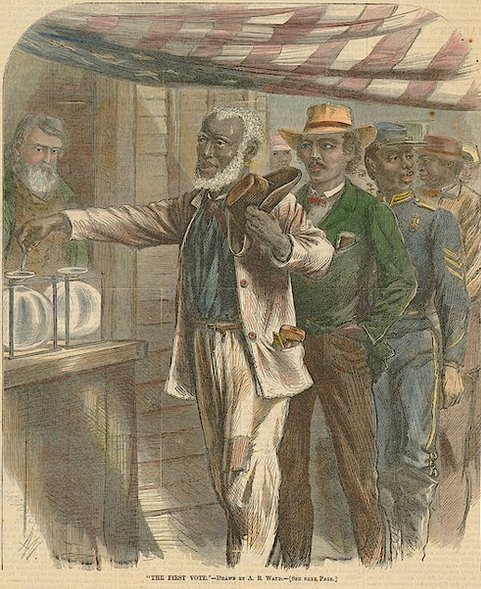
African Americans voted for the first time in 1867. The Lost Cause myth portrayed the Reconstruction era negatively.

American historian Alan T. Nolan states that the Lost Cause "facilitated the reunification of the North and the South". He quotes historian Gaines M. Foster, who wrote that "signs of respect from former foes and northern publishers made acceptance of reunion easier. By the mid-eighties, most southerners had decided to build a future within a reunited nation. A few remained irreconcilable, but their influence in southern society declined rapidly." Nolan mentioned a second aspect: "The reunion was exclusively a white man's phenomenon and the price of the reunion was the sacrifice of the African Americans."

The historian Caroline Janney stated:

Providing a sense of relief to white Southerners who feared being dishonored by defeat, the Lost Cause was largely accepted in the years following the war by white Americans who found it to be a useful tool in reconciling North and South.

The Yale historian David W. Blight wrote:

The Lost Cause became an integral part of national reconciliation by dint of sheer sentimentalism, by political argument, and by recurrent celebrations and rituals. For most white Southerners, the Lost Cause evolved into a language of vindication and renewal, as well as an array of practices and public monuments through which they could solidify both their Southern pride and their Americanness.

In exploring the literature of reconciliation, the historian William Tynes Cowa wrote, "The cult of the Lost Cause was part of a larger cultural project: the reconciliation of North and South after the Civil War". He identified a typical image in postwar fiction: a materialistic, rich Yankee man marrying an impoverished spiritual Southern bride as a symbol of happy national reunion. Examining films and visual art, Gallagher identified the theme of "white people North and South [who] extol the American virtues both sides manifested during the war, to exalt the restored nation that emerged from the conflict, and to mute the role of African Americans".

Historian and journalist Bruce Catton argued that the myth or legend helped achieve national reconciliation between North and South. He concluded that "the legend of the lost cause has served the entire country very well", and he went on to say:

The things that were done during the Civil War have not been forgotten, of course, but we now see them through a veil. We have elevated the entire conflict to the realm where it is no longer explosive. It is a part of American legend, a part of American history, a part, if you will, of American romance. It moves men mightily, to this day, but it does not move them in the direction of picking up their guns and going at it again. We have had national peace since the war ended, and we will always have it, and I think the way Lee and his soldiers conducted themselves in the hours of surrender has a great deal to do with it.

From the beginning of the twentieth century through the 1920s, Confederate statues were raised as a symbolic complement to the Jim Crow laws of the South. They embodied a narrative of the Civil War that emphasized the reconciliation of whites in the North and the South who shared in the glory of their valorous soldiers, over an emancipationist interpretation that recognized the struggle for the civil rights of black people, anathema to white supremacists. During the mid-1950s to the late 1960s, as the centennial of the Civil War drew closer, numerous new monuments were raised, sometimes as a direct response in opposition to the Civil Rights Movement.

==== New South ====
Historian Jacquelyn Dowd Hall has written that the Lost-Cause theme was fully developed around 1900 in a mood not of despair but of triumphalism for the New South. Much was left out of the Lost Cause:

[N]either the trauma of slavery for African Americans nor their heroic, heartbreaking freedom struggle found a place in that story. But the Lost Cause narrative also suppressed the memories of many white southerners. Memories of how, under slavery, power bred cruelty. Memories of the bloody, unbearable realities of war. Written out too were the competing memories and identities that set white southerners one against another, pitting the planters against the up-country, Unionists against Confederates, Populists and mill workers against the corporations, home-front women against war-besotted, broken men.

== Later use ==
Professor Gallagher contended that Douglas Southall Freeman's definitive four-volume biography of Lee, published in 1934, "cemented in American letters an interpretation of Lee very close to Early's utterly heroic figure". In that work, Lee's subordinates were primarily to blame for errors that lost battles. Longstreet was the most common target of such attacks. Richard Ewell, Jubal Early, J. E. B. Stuart, A. P. Hill, George Pickett, and many others were frequently attacked and blamed by Southerners in an attempt to deflect criticism from Lee.

Hudson Strode wrote a widely read scholarly three-volume biography of Confederate President Jefferson Davis, published in the 1950s and 1960s. A leading scholarly journal that reviewed it stressed Strode's political biases:

His [Jefferson Davis's] enemies are devils, and his friends, like Davis himself, have been canonized. Strode not only attempts to sanctify Davis but also the Confederate point of view, and this study should be relished by those vigorously sympathetic with the Lost Cause.

One Dallas newspaper editorial in 2018 referred to the Texas Civil War Museum as "a lovely bit of 'Lost Cause' propaganda".

=== From the twentieth century to the present ===
The former flag of Mississippi incorporates the Confederate battle flag design. It was adopted in 1894 after the state's so-called "redemption", and relinquished in 2020 during the George Floyd protests.

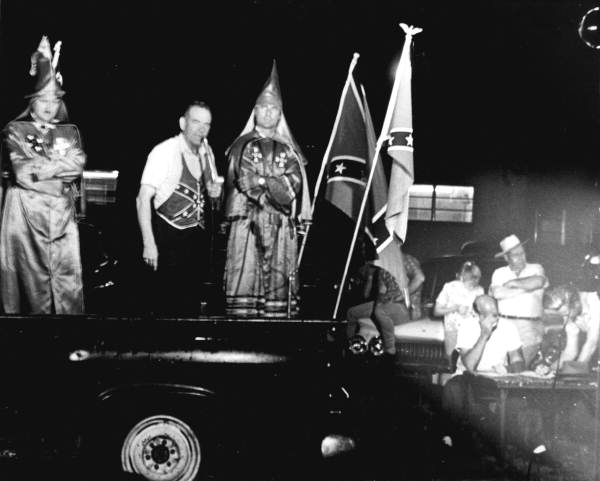
During the civil rights movement, the Confederate flag was used by white supremacists and the Ku Klux Klan to intimidate Black Americans.

The basic assumptions of the Lost Cause have proved durable for many in the modern South. The Lost Cause tenets frequently emerge during controversies surrounding the public display of the Confederate flag and various state flags. The historian John Coski noted that the Sons of Confederate Veterans (SCV), the "most visible, active, and effective defender of the flag", "carried forward into the twenty-first century, virtually unchanged, the Lost Cause historical interpretations and ideological vision formulated at the turn of the twentieth". Coski wrote concerning "the flag wars of the late twentieth century":

From the ... early 1950s, SCV officials defended the integrity of the battle flag against trivialization and against those who insisted that its display was unpatriotic or racist. SCV spokesmen reiterated the consistent argument that the South fought a legitimate war for independence, not a war to defend slavery, and that the ascendant "Yankee" view of history falsely vilified the South and led people to misinterpret the battle flag.

The Confederate States used several flags during its existence from 1861 to 1865. Since the end of the American Civil War, the personal and official use of Confederate flags and flags derived from them has continued under considerable controversy. "Following the war, proponents of the Lost Cause used the battle flag to represent Southern valor and honor, although it also was implicitly connected to white supremacy. In the mid-twentieth century, the battle flag simultaneously became ubiquitous in American culture while, partly through the efforts of the Ku Klux Klan, becoming increasingly tied to racial violence and intimidation." African Americans interpreted the battle flag as an opposition to the civil rights movement. Neo-Confederates disagree and argue the flag is about states' rights and southern heritage and not racial hatred. The United Daughters of the Confederacy ingrained Lost Cause ideology in the schools of southern states by placing Confederate flags and portraits of Confederate heroes in classrooms and assisting teachers with their history lesson plans. During World War II, African American troops strongly objected to the use of the Confederate flag by white troops because of the hypocrisy of waving a flag that fought against the United States. In the 1950s, head of the Civil Rights Congress (CRC), William L. Patterson, led a campaign to ban the sale of Confederate flags in stores in the United States. Patterson wrote a letter to an editor of the New York Times saying that the Confederate flag may encourage "mounting fascism" and is "conducive to everything for which the Confederacy stood and stands". Debates about the meaning of the Confederate flag continue, and several states' flags historically have had references to the Confederacy.

=== Confederate Heroes Day ===
Confederate Heroes Day began as Robert E. Lee Day in 1931 in Texas, and in 1973 the Texas legislature changed Robert E. Lee Day to Confederate Heroes Day to remember and honor Confederate soldiers who fought in the American Civil War. Historian and former professor at Southeast Missouri State University, W. Stuart Towns, considers Confederate Heroes Day a manifestation of Lost Cause ideology. Over the years, attempts to abolish the holiday have failed. The holiday is celebrated on January 19, the birthday of Confederate General Robert E. Lee, which falls a few days after Martin Luther King Jr. Day on January 15. African American lawmakers continue to seek ways to abolish Confederate Heroes Day. The state of Florida continues to celebrate Robert E. Lee Day on January 19. A new bill passed in 2024 is retroactive to 2017 and prohibits the removal of Florida's Confederate memorials. The state continues to celebrate other Confederate holidays, including Confederate Memorial Day on April 26 and Jefferson Davis's birthday on June 3.

=== Confederate History Month ===
The American Civil War began on April 12, 1861, when Confederates fired the first shots at Fort Sumter in the Charleston Harbor of South Carolina. To commemorate this day, in April 1994 Confederate History Month (also called Confederate Heritage Month) was created. Seven southern states celebrate Confederate Heritage Month —they are: Alabama, Florida, Georgia, Louisiana, Mississippi, Texas and Virginia. The Southern Poverty Law Center interprets this celebration of Confederate history in the month of April as part of Lost Cause ideology that wants to portray the Confederate States and secession positively.

== United Daughters of the Confederacy ==
=== UDC support of the Ku Klux Klan ===
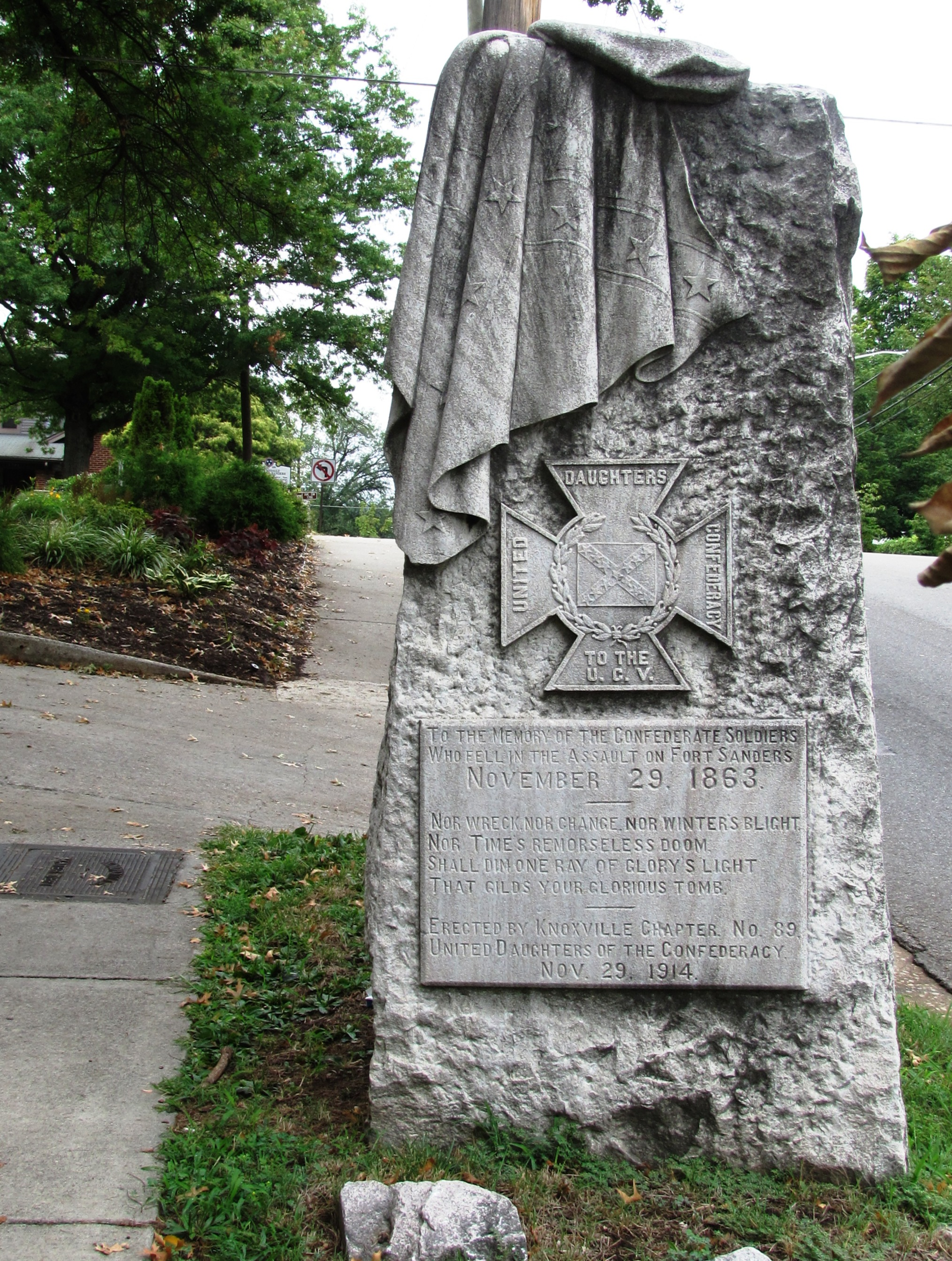
The United Daughters of the Confederacy helped promulgate Lost Cause ideology through the construction of numerous memorials, such as this one in Tennessee.

The Lost Cause became a key part of the reconciliation process between North and South by virtue of political argument, outright sentimentalism, and white Southerners' postwar commemorations. The United Daughters of the Confederacy (UDC) is a major organization and has been associated with the Lost Cause for over one century.

The United Daughters of the Confederacy portrayed the Ku Klux Klan (KKK) as saviors of white women and children and saviors of the South from what they thought was a majority black rule. UDC member Laura Martin Rose wrote articles for the Confederate Veteran, praised the KKK as saviors, and described the movie, The Birth of a Nation, as "more powerful than all else in bringing about the realization of 'things as they were' during Reconstruction", and wrote a primer for school children about the KKK. In 1914, Rose published The Ku Klux Klan; or Invisible Empire and believed Klan violence was necessary by stating Klan violence "delivered the South from a bondage worse than death". Rose wrote her book so Southern children would know that the history of the KKK was created by Confederate veterans, saying: "inspire them with the respect and admiration for the Confederate soldiers, who were the real Ku Klux, and whose deeds of courage and valor, have never been surpassed". UDC historian Mildred Lewis Rutherford also supported the KKK and said: "[t]he Ku Klux Klan was an absolute necessity in the South at this time. This Order was not composed of 'riffraff' as has been represented in history, but of the very flower of Southern manhood. The chivalry of the South demanded protection for the women and children of the South."

In 1917, the UDC commemorated the KKK's founding in 1866 by former Confederate veterans in Pulaski, Tennessee, with a plaque on a building where the Klan was founded. In 1926, in Concord, North Carolina, the UDC commemorated the KKK with a monument. The inscription is "In Commemoration of the 'KU KLUX KLAN' during the Reconstruction period following the 'WAR BETWEEN THE STATES' this marker is placed on their assembly ground. The original banner (as above) was made in Cabarrus County. Erected by the DODSON-RAMSEUR Chapter of the United Daughters of the Confederacy. 1926."

=== Stone Mountain carving ===
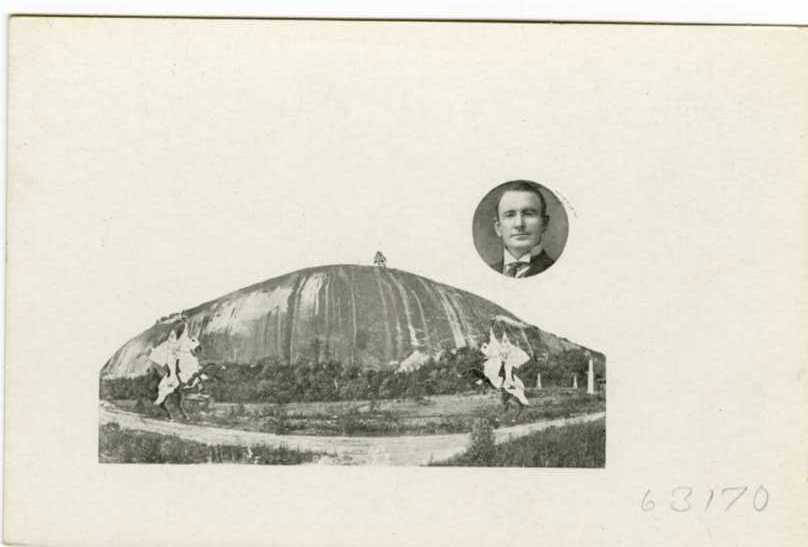
An image of Stone Mountain with Knights of the Ku Klux Klan on horses, and a portrait of William J. Simmons

The largest Confederate memorial in the United States is located near Atlanta, Georgia, at Stone Mountain. Caroline Helen Jamison Plane was the president of the United Daughters of the Confederacy (UDC) chapter in Atlanta and in 1915 planned a project to carve a memorial of Confederate figures at Stone Mountain. After watching the movie, The Birth of a Nation, Plane also wanted Ku Klux Klan members carved into the mountain's face. Plane wrote a letter to the sculptor, Gutzon Borglum, who was involved with the KKK, about the project and her idea of including KKK members in the Stone Mountain carving inspired by the movie. She wrote: "Since seeing this wonderful and beautiful picture of Reconstruction in the South, I feel that it is due to the Ku Klux Klan which saved us from Negro domination and carpet-bag rule, that it might be immortalized on Stone Mountain". The 1915 film The Birth of a Nation, inspired Methodist preacher William J. Simmons to reestablish the KKK at Stone Mountain by burning a cross and initiating 16 new Klansmen. In 1948, Stone Mountain was the location chosen for the KKK to initiate 700 new members. For decades this location served as a meeting place for Ku Klux Klan rituals.

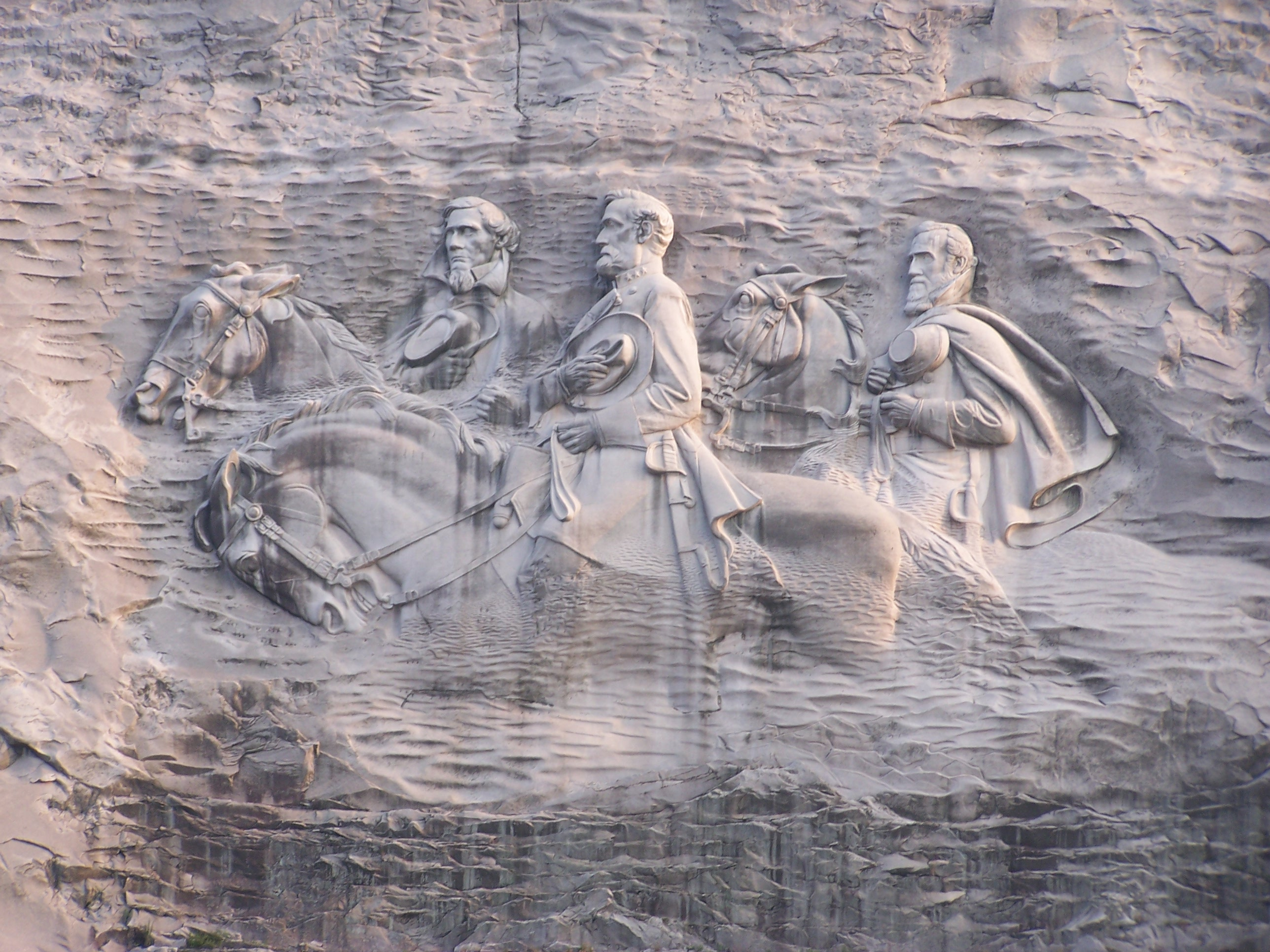
Stone Mountain carving

Caroline H. J. Plane persuaded the owners of Stone Mountain to let the UDC have access to the property. Due to funding issues, the changing of sculptors from Borglum to Augustus Lukeman, and two intervening World Wars, the carving of Stone Mountain was not completed until 1972. Confederate leaders Jefferson Davis, Robert E. Lee, and Stonewall Jackson are carved into the mountain's face, but the completed project does not have Klansmen carved into the face of the mountain. Black Americans interpret the carving as an intimidation tactic by white supremacists, and as their effort to reclaim the South from the civil rights movement. Some white southerners interpret the carving as signifying their southern heritage and honoring ancestors who fought in the Civil War to preserve states' rights. Historian Grace Elizabeth Hale interprets the carving as "a sort of neo-Confederatism".

=== Women's club movement ===
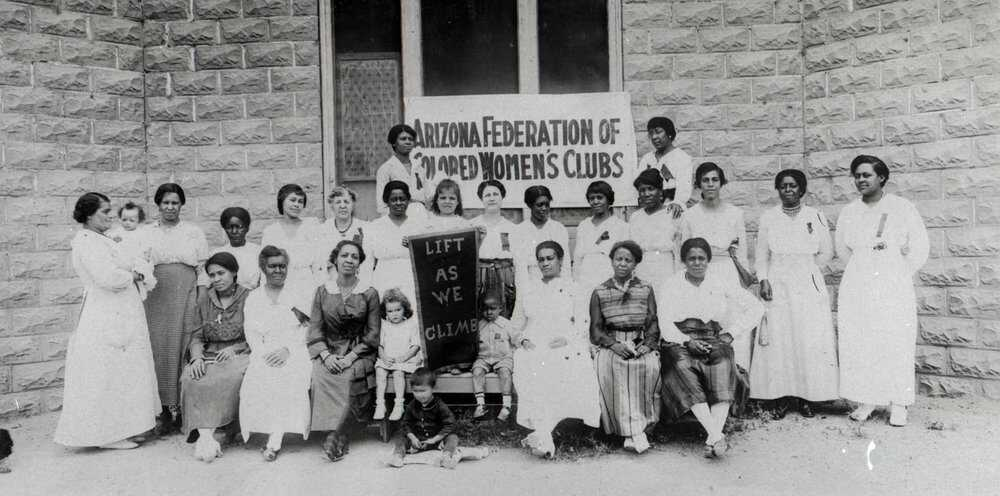
Black women's clubs, such as the Arizona Federation of Colored Women's Clubs in 1909, and teachers, advocated against Lost Cause literature in schools.

The women's club movement was racially divided. White women's club and suffrage activism refused to include Black women. White women's clubs successfully lobbied for the imposition of a racist Lost Cause curriculum in schools. White women's literary clubs advocated that only Lost Cause literature written by former Confederates and their children should be read. Some of the white women who were members of the United Daughters of the Confederacy (UDC) were also members of white women's clubs. Black teachers fought against Lost Cause literature in schools. "Black 'clubwomen across the South and in South Carolina understood that they had to define African American identity for themselves through their study of history, literature, and culture.'"

The UDC led the deployment of Lost Cause textbooks in Southern schools and created children's auxiliaries called Children of the Confederacy. The UDC created a 52-card game for children about Confederate leaders, officers, Confederate states, and Confederate victorious battles. In the early 20th century, the UDC and the United Confederate Veterans worked together, and each group created a Historical Committee to influence American textbook industries to ensure that only Lost Cause textbooks were taught in schools. The UDC and UCV succeeded in 1910 as Lost Cause literature dominated United States classrooms. Mildred Lewis Rutherford was the UDC president in Georgia from 1899 to 1902 and the UDC national historian from 1911 to 1916. She advocated that subcommittees be organized in every state and that only Lost Cause narratives be allowed in American textbooks. In 1919, she published A Measuring Rod to Test Textbooks and Reference Books in Schools, Colleges and Libraries, which set guidelines for schools and colleges to exclude narratives of the horrors of slavery, slavery as the cause of the Civil War, and the secession of Southern states from the Union. To combat the Lost Cause narratives in American classrooms, in 1946 the National Association for the Advancement of Colored People (NAACP) embarked on a campaign to include African American history in American history textbooks. The UDC funded poor descendants of Confederate Veterans to go to college and, after graduation, teach students about the Lost Cause. The UDC controlled the writing, publishing, and banning of American history textbooks for decades and partnered with the Ku Klux Klan (KKK), legislatures, and school committees to positively portray the Confederacy as heroes in textbooks and not as traitors or enslavers. According to some historians, Lost Cause ideology continues to affect how slavery and the Civil War are taught in American classrooms.

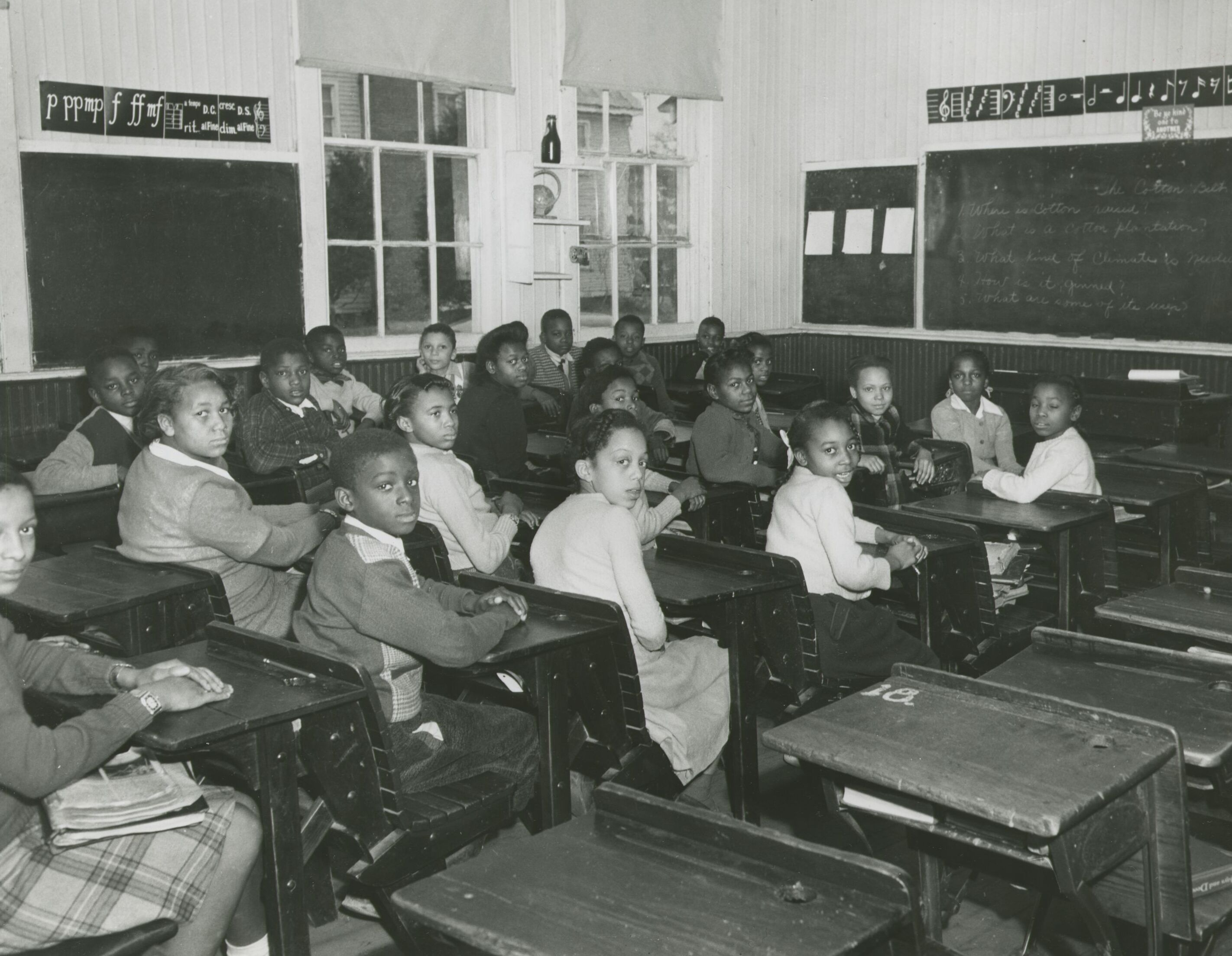
Lost Cause textbooks taught African American students in segregated schools.

Mamie Garvin Fields was a civil rights activist, teacher, and African American women's club member from Charleston, South Carolina, who advocated against Lost Cause narratives in Charleston's segregated schools. As a child, she attended Shaw School in Charleston; she later remembered white teachers there teaching about the Lost Cause. After she finished school, Lost Cause ideology continued to be taught to black students, and some segregated schools had white teachers teaching it to black students. African American teachers refused to teach black students using Lost Cause textbooks. Black teachers taught their students about Frederick Douglass and other historic African Americans.

The Senate of Virginia in 1950 responded to the growing activism of civil rights activists against white supremacy and created the Virginia History and Textbook Commission to publish Lost Cause textbooks. Virginia's Lost Cause textbooks erased Native American history. Virginia's NAACP chapter and the Virginia Teachers Association (VTA), which was a Black educators' organization, opposed Lost Cause textbooks in Virginia's classrooms and taught African American history. By the 1970s, Lost Cause literature was removed from Virginia's classrooms due to political changes such as the new voting power of African Americans under the Voting Rights Act of 1965 and the removal of the Byrd political machine.

The new Texas Essential Knowledge and Skills (TEKS) state school standards, the official K-12 curriculum for the state of Texas, includes Neo-Confederate ideology. In 2012, author Edward H. Sebesta described how Lost Cause ideology is placed in Texas history books: "Rebel leader Jefferson Davis, is elevated to peer status with Abraham Lincoln; slaveholder Thomas J. 'Stonewall' Jackson, is venerated as a pious, conservative friend of blacks; and Hiram R. Revels, celebrated as the first African American elected to the US Senate, actually supported the cause of white supremacy." This history curriculum instills a Neo-Confederate ideology in students and enables the movement. In October 2015, outrage erupted online following the discovery of a Texan school's geography textbook, which described slaves as "immigrants" and "workers". The publisher, McGraw-Hill, announced that it would change the wording. Until the 2019–2020 school year, the Texas social studies curriculum required teaching that slavery was a tertiary cause of the Civil War behind "states' rights" and "sectionalism". The updated curriculum describes the "expansion of slavery" as having a "central role" in bringing about the Civil War, but sectionalism and states' rights remain.

Professor of educational policy Chara Bohan studied the history of American history textbooks published after Reconstruction into the present day and found that Lost Cause narratives about the Civil War predominate in Southern classrooms, and over time made their way into history textbooks used in the North. Bohan explains: "After the Civil War, from the 1870s through the 1910s, public schooling became more widespread in the South, and Confederate sympathizers wanted to ensure that their children received an 'appropriate' education on Southern history and culture. To that end, Southern states developed statewide adoption policies for textbooks. This allowed the state textbook committees to control content by demanding changes or threatening to cancel book contracts unless the publishers acquiesced. Today, most of the states with statewide textbook adoption policies are still in the South. To keep their business, Northern publishers began adapting history books to appease Southerners, essentially publishing a separate version of Civil War history for those states. These editions reinforced a Lost Cause narrative for Southern audiences." Bohan says this sympathetic portrayal of Lost Cause ideology continues today in the history textbooks of various states.

=== "Faithful slaves" monuments ===
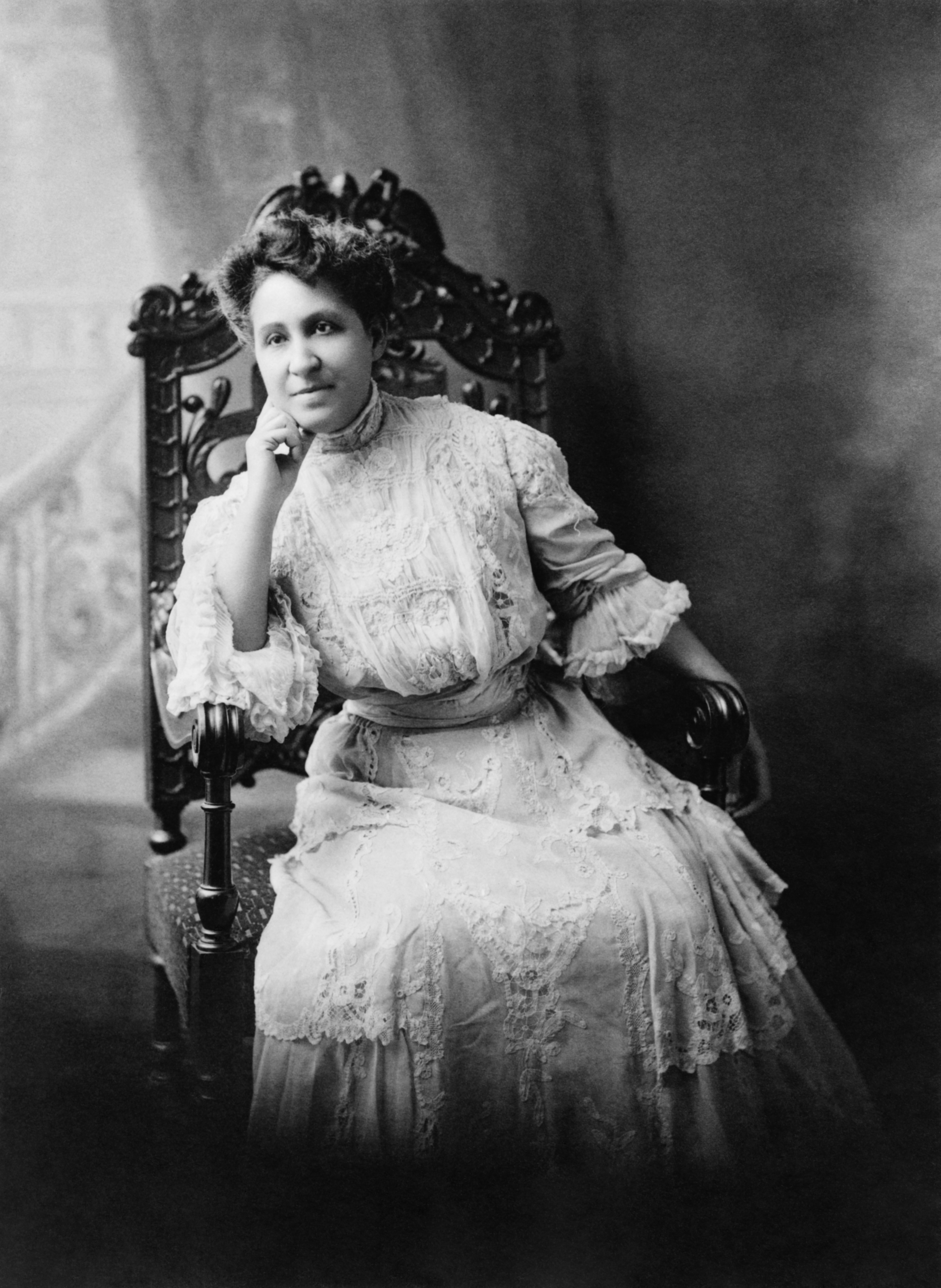
Mary Church Terrell and other Black women advocated against the United Daughters of the Confederacy's plan to erect a "Mammy" monument in Washington, D.C.

In 1904, the United Daughters of the Confederacy (UDC) campaigned for the erection of "faithful slaves" monuments in Southern states to commemorate the history of "loyal" slaves in an effort to erase the horrors of slavery and push the false narrative that enslaved Black people were treated well by their enslavers and were "faithful" to them. Southern Congressmen supported the UDC initiative to erect stereotypical monuments about the "loyal" "mammies" and "faithful slaves". In 1923, the UDC planned on erecting a "Mammy memorial" in Washington, D.C. to memorialize the enslaved Black mothers who were "happy" to take care of their enslavers' families and children. This project was supported by the U.S. Senate when it passed bill S. 4119 on February 28, 1923, for the creation of a Mammy statue to be erected on Massachusetts Avenue near a statue of Union General Philip Sheridan. Black newspapers such as the St. Louis Argus, The Chicago Defender, the Baltimore Afro-American, and the Washington Tribune opposed bill S. 4119 in their editorials and cartoons. The National Association for the Advancement of Colored People (NAACP) wrote an oppositional letter regarding the Mammy statue to the Senate. Black clubwomen strongly advocated against this movement; their activism and that of other Black civil rights groups prevented the erection of the monument. Mary Church Terrell, who was a suffragist, civil rights activist, educator, and one of the founders of the National Association of Colored Women's Clubs in 1896, wrote a letter advocating against the Mammy monument. In January 1923, Terrell wrote:

Colored women all over the United States stand aghast at the idea of creating a Black Mammy monument in the Capital of the United States. The condition of the slave woman was so pitiably, hopelessly helpless that it is difficult to see how any woman, whether white or black, could take any pleasure in a marble statue to perpetuate her memory. The Black Mammy had no home life. In the very nature of the case, she could have none. Legal marriage was impossible for her. If she went through a farce ceremony with a slave man, he could be sold away from her at any time, or she might be sold from him and be taken as a concubine by her master, his son, the overseer, or any other white man on the place who might desire her. No colored woman could look upon a statue of a Black Mammy with a dry eye, when she remembered how often the slave woman's heart was torn with anguish because the children, either of her master or their slave father, were ruthlessly torn from her in infancy or in youth to be sold "down the country" wherein all human probability she would never see them again.

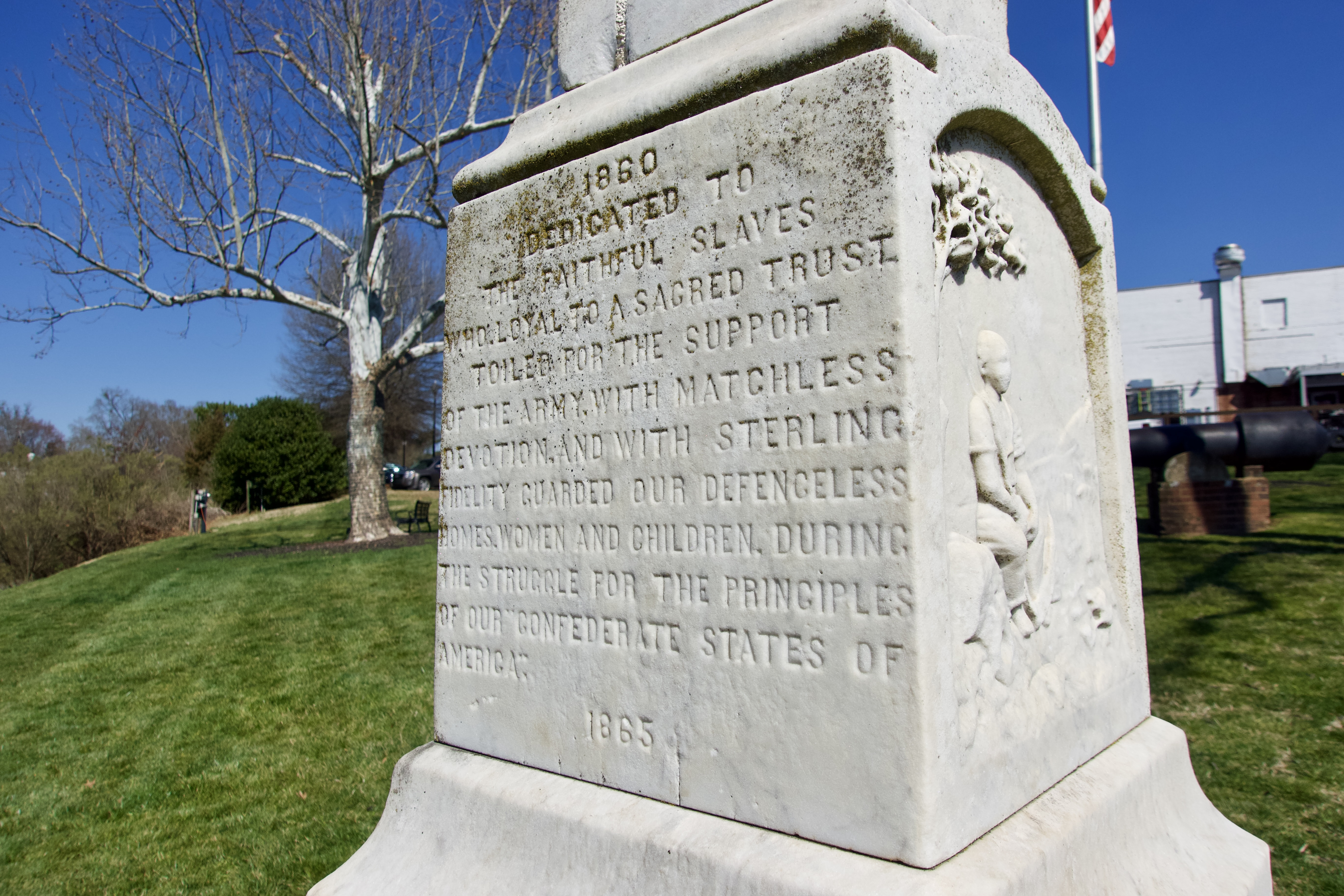
A "loyal slaves" monument with inscription and carving in Confederate Park in Fort Mill, South Carolina

Prior to the UDC, a faithful slaves monument was erected in South Carolina in 1896 by Samuel E. White, who was a former cotton mill owner, and by the Jefferson Davis Memorial Association. Other Lost Cause monuments were erected in the 1890s and early 1900s in South Carolina. On June 4, 1914, the UDC erected a loyal slave monument on the grounds of Arlington National Cemetery in Virginia. The monument stands near the home of former Confederate general Robert E. Lee.

In 2020, during the George Floyd protests, the UDC's headquarters in Richmond, Virginia, was graffitied and burned by protesters because of its role in the erection of Confederate monuments and perpetuating the Lost Cause ideology. Protesters used the "Karen meme" because the UDC was formed by privileged middle-to-upper-class white women.

=== Gender roles ===
Men had typically honored the role of women during the war by noting their total loyalty to the Cause. Popular literature often depicted elite white Southern women according to the patriarchal stereotype of helpless Southern belles who seek husbands as a lifeline to restore the fortunes of a ruined plantation or to carry them away from it, as if women could not possibly support themselves. White women on the plantations did face apparent danger without the presence of their men to serve in the traditional role as protectors. Nevertheless, the development of separate or trust estates for white women during the antebellum period had protected their property from their husbands or their husbands' debtors and allowed them to operate businesses and to manage plantations.

Women took a much different approach to the Cause and their position by emphasizing female activism, initiative, and leadership. When most of the men had left for the war, women had taken command of the homestead, found substitute foods, rediscovered their old traditional skills with the spinning wheel when factory cloth became unavailable, and had run the farm or plantation operations, including the management of enslaved African Americans the elites considered property. According to Drew Gilpin Faust, a campaign was mounted by newspapers and political leaders such as Jefferson Davis, alongside writers of poetry and song, exhorting Southern women to revive the production of cloth goods at home. Many Southern white men were bothered when they discovered that their wives had begun spinning and weaving textiles. They regarded such labor as degrading for elite women. Forced to undertake homespun production due to the North's blockade of goods, many women shared those attitudes but decided they had no choice.

== Religious dimension ==
Charles Wilson argues that many white Southerners, most of whom were conservative and pious evangelical Protestants, sought reasons for the Confederacy's defeat in religion. They said that the Confederacy's defeat in the war was God's punishment for their sins, so they increasingly turned to religion for solace. The postwar era yielded a regional "civil religion", heavily laden with symbolism and ritual, and primarily celebrated by clergymen. Wilson says that the ministers constructed:

Lost Cause ritualistic forms that celebrated their regional mythological and theological beliefs. They used the Lost Cause to warn Southerners of their decline from past virtue, to promote moral reform, to encourage conversion to Christianity, and to educate the young in Southern traditions; in the fullness of time, they related it to American values.

Acting in their cultural and religious environments, white Southerners tried to defend what their defeat in 1865 made impossible for them to defend on a political level. The South's loss in what they viewed as a holy war left these white Southerners facing inadequacy, failure, and guilt. They faced them by forming what C. Vann Woodward called a uniquely Southern "tragic sense of life" expressed in their civil religion that combined Southern values with conservative and moralistic Christian values.

Poole stated that in fighting to defeat the Republican Reconstruction government in South Carolina in 1876, white conservative Democrats portrayed the Lost Cause scenario through "Hampton Days" celebrations and shouted, "Hampton or Hell!" They staged the contest between Reconstruction opponent and Democratic candidate Wade Hampton and incumbent Republican Governor Daniel H. Chamberlain as a religious struggle between good and evil and called for "redemption". The white Southern conservatives who committed to the dismantling of Reconstruction called themselves "Redeemers".

The popularization of Lost Cause mythology and the erection of monuments to the Confederacy was primarily the work of Southern women, centered in the United Daughters of the Confederacy (UDC).

UDC leaders were determined to assert women's cultural authority over virtually every representation of the region's past. They did this by lobbying for the creation of state archives and the construction of state museums, the preservation of national historic sites, and the construction of historic highways; compiling genealogies; interviewing former soldiers; writing history textbooks; and erecting monuments, which now moved triumphantly from cemeteries into town centers. More than half a century before women's history and public history emerged as fields of inquiry and action, the UDC, along with other women's associations, strove to etch women's accomplishments into the historical record and take history to the people, from the nursery and the fireside to the schoolhouse and the public square.

The duty of memorializing the Confederate dead was a major activity for Southerners who were devoted to the Lost Cause, and chapters of the UDC played a central role in performing it. The UDC was especially influential across the South in the early 20th century, where its main role was to preserve and uphold the memory of Confederate veterans, especially the husbands, sons, fathers, and brothers who died in the war. Its long-term impact was to promote by Lost Cause iconography an idealized image of the prewar plantation South as a society that was crushed by the forces of Yankee modernization, which also undermined traditional gender roles. In Missouri, a border state, the UDC was active in establishing an independent system of memorials.

The Southern states set up their own pension systems for veterans and their dependents, especially for widows, because none of them was eligible for federal pensions. The southern pensions were designed to honor the Lost Cause and reduce the severe poverty which was prevalent in the region. Male applicants for pensions had to demonstrate their continued loyalty to the Lost Cause. Female applicants for pensions were rejected if their moral reputations were in question.

In Natchez, Mississippi, the local newspapers and veterans had a role in the maintenance of the Lost Cause mythos. However, elite white women were central in establishing memorials such as the Civil War monument, which was dedicated on Memorial Day 1890. The Lost Cause enabled women noncombatants to lay a claim to the central event in their redefinition of Southern history.

The UDC was quite prominent but not at all unique in its appeal to upper-class white Southern women. "The number of women's clubs devoted to filial piety and history was staggering", stated historian W. Fitzhugh Brundage. He noted two typical clubwomen in Texas and Mississippi who, between them, belonged to the United Daughters of the Confederacy, the Daughters of the American Revolution, the Association for the Preservation of Virginia Antiquities, the Daughters of the Pilgrims, the Daughters of the War of 1812, the Daughters of Colonial Governors, and the Daughters of the Founders and Patriots of America, the Order of the First Families of Virginia, the Colonial Dames of America, and a few other history-oriented societies. Comparable men, on the other hand, were much less interested in belonging to historical organizations; instead, they devoted themselves to secret fraternal societies and emphasized athletic, political, and financial exploits to prove their manhood. Brundage notes that after women's suffrage came in 1920, the historical role of the women's organizations eroded.

Brundage concluded that in their heyday during the first two decades of the 20th century:

These women architects of whites' historical memory, by both explaining and mystifying the historical roots of white supremacy and elite power in the South, performed a conspicuous civic function at a time of heightened concern about the perpetuation of social and political hierarchies. Although denied the franchise, organized white women nevertheless played a dominant role in crafting the historical memory that would inform and undergird southern politics and public life.

== Symbols ==
=== Confederate generals ===
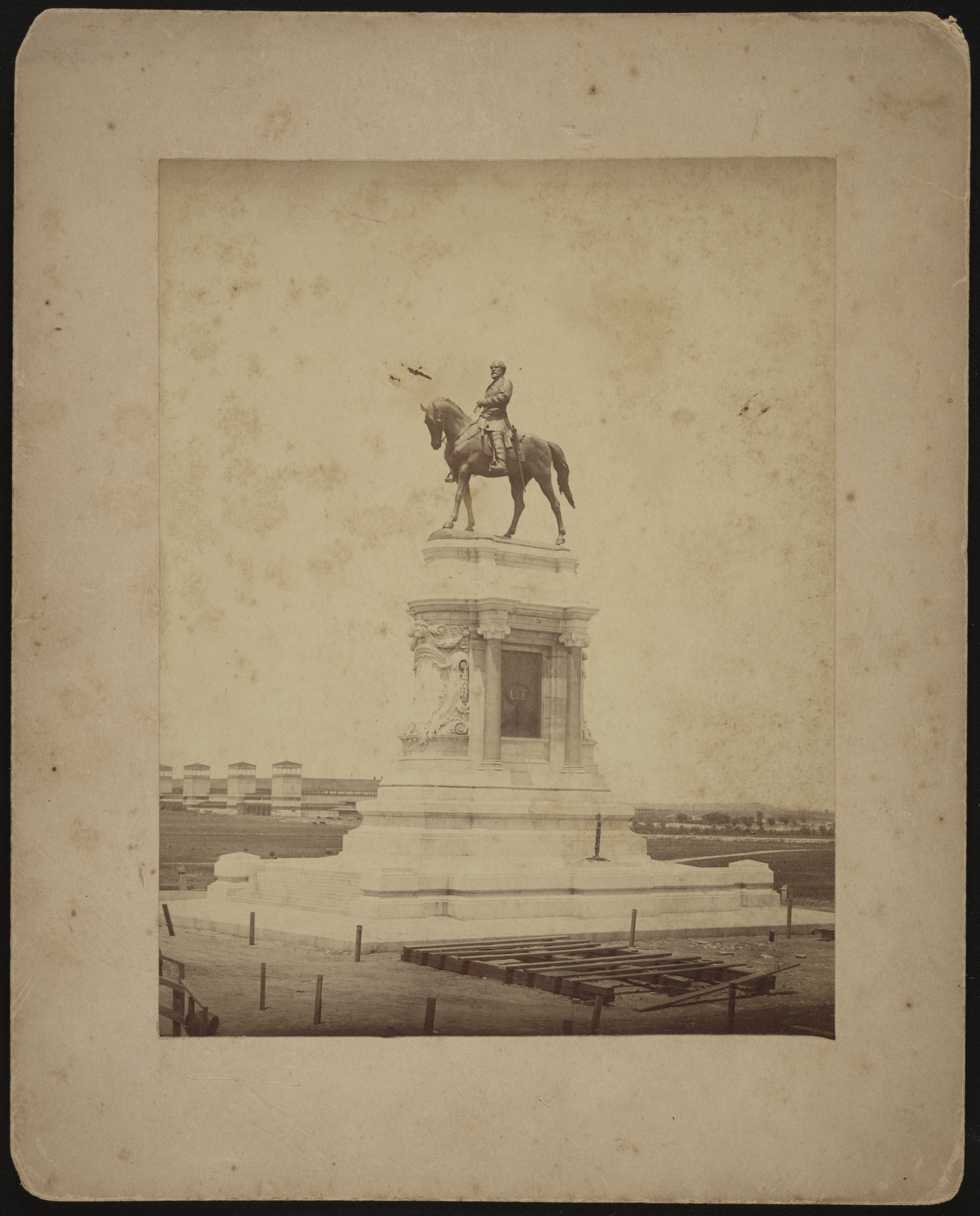
The Robert E. Lee monument was erected in 1890 in Richmond, Virginia. In 2020, the Lee monument was graffitied during the George Floyd protests and under the Stoney government was removed in 2021. Other Confederate monuments were removed on Monument Avenue during and after the George Floyd protests.

The character of Robert E. Lee and the doomed Pickett's Charge were powerful symbols of the Lost Cause. A representative of the Missouri division of the United Confederate Veterans (UCV) gave a speech at its tenth annual reunion in which he spoke of "a new religion" born in the South. Lloyd A. Hunter treats this new religion as a vital force in the lives of Confederates after the war. A faith focused on the "immortal Confederacy" and an image of the South as a sacred land, it was founded on the myth of the Lost Cause. David Ulbrich wrote, "Already revered during the war, Robert E. Lee acquired a divine mystique within Southern culture after it. Remembered as a leader whose soldiers would loyally follow him into every fight no matter how desperate, Lee emerged from the conflict to become an icon of the Lost Cause and the ideal of the antebellum Southern gentleman, an honorable and pious man who selflessly served Virginia and the Confederacy. Lee's tactical brilliance at Second Bull Run and Chancellorsville took on legendary status, and despite his accepting full responsibility for the defeat at Gettysburg, Lee remained largely infallible for Southerners and was spared criticism even from historians until recent times."

Alan T. Nolan describes Lee as a "visible sign of the elevation of the Lost Cause" in the South's folk history after the war. Nolan further observes that by the 1980s, the excellence of Lee's generalship was the consensus of standard reference sources and dogma in popular sources such as the Time-Life The Civil War series. He cites the Encyclopedia Americana calling Lee "one of the greatest, if not the greatest, soldier who ever spoke the English language" in its 1989 edition, and the Encyclopedia Britannica edition of the same year describing him similarly.

Among Lee's subordinates, the key villain in Jubal Early's view was General Longstreet. Although Lee took all responsibility for the defeats, particularly the one at Gettysburg, Early's writings place the Confederate defeat at Gettysburg squarely on Longstreet's shoulders by accusing him of failing to attack at dawn on July 2, 1863, as instructed by Lee. In fact, however, Lee issued no such order and never expressed dissatisfaction with the second-day actions of his "Old War Horse". Because Gettysburg was perceived as the "high tide of the Confederacy", the loss there was seen to have led to the failure of the entire war to achieve independence for the South, the blame for which was hung on Longstreet's disinclination to attack. These charges stuck because Longstreet was already disparaged by many high-profile Southerners due to his reputation as a "scalawag", caused by postwar endorsement of and cooperation with his close friend and in-law, President Grant. Furthermore, Longstreet advised white Southerners to cooperate with Reconstruction, in an effort to control the black vote, a fact that was unappreciated by his fellows. He also joined the Republican Party and accepted a federal position.

Following the war, the national media, including Northern newspapers and magazines, printed articles that contributed to a trend of portraying Lee as the unconquerable Southern general who was victorious even in his surrender at Appomattox, through his devotion to duty and his resolve to help rebuild the South and educate its youth. Historical and literary magazines in the South cultivated a romantic mystique depicting Lee and his cavalry officers as knightly cavaliers. Albert Bledsoe, once a fellow lawyer with Abraham Lincoln in Illinois, and a former professor at the University of Virginia, railed in Baltimore's Southern Review, of which he was editor, that the Northern victory over the South meant nothing because the South had not been defeated but was overcome by the overwhelming numbers of Union troops. He called Lee, in a passage quoted by Thomas L. Connelly, a military genius whose skills were "unsurpassed in the annals of war" and dedicated his magazine to justifying the Lost Cause.

Grant said in an 1878 interview that he rejected the Lost Cause notion that the South had simply been overwhelmed by numbers. Grant wrote, "This is the way public opinion was made during the war and this is the way history is made now. We never overwhelmed the South [...] What we won from the South we won by hard fighting." Grant further noted that when comparing resources, the "4,000,000 of negroes" who "kept the farms, protected the families, supported the armies, and were really a reserve force" were not treated as a southern asset.

Postwar Virginian writers made Lee the embodiment and the epitome of what they regarded as the superior men produced by antebellum Virginia, which they romanticized as a finer society. By the beginning of the 20th century, Lee had become the preeminent symbol of all the noble traits of character ascribed to those men who belonged to this supposedly more genteel society. Southern writers justified the Lost Cause argument with an appeal to the greatness and the nobility of Robert E. Lee, not only as being above all Southerners, but as a great American and as a "supremely great and good man". This argument was disseminated in literature throughout the country and Lee was made into a national hero of the United States.

Brian Holden Reid holds that the literature was skewed in favor of the Southern viewpoint by the beginning of the 20th century, and that an overwhelming Southern bias persisted until the 1960s among historians. He says the school of writers who felt sympathy with the myth of the Lost Cause was influenced by novelists, professional writers, and screenwriters in Hollywood. Most of them embraced the sentimental narrative of a valiant Confederacy overwhelmed by the sheer numbers of Union fighters and its superior resources, and Robert E. Lee was vitally important as a symbol sustaining this romantic interpretation of events. Theodore Roosevelt declared that what Lee had accomplished was a "matter of pride to all our countrymen".

== Contemporary historians ==
Contemporary historians overwhelmingly agree that secession was motivated by slavery. The most important of secession's numerous causes were preservation and expansion of slavery. The confusion may come from blending the causes of secession with the causes of the war, which were separate but related issues.

According to Henry Louis Gates Jr., "the Lost Cause was fundamentally based on white supremacy". He posits that W. E. B. Du Bois understood, even beyond political realities, that the falsified narrative of the Lost Cause was anti-Black and would solidify a fabricated, romanticized narrative of American history. Gates says that Du Bois's Black Reconstruction located the struggles and achievements of Black Americans at the center of the story of the Reconstruction period. This was a challenge to Lost Cause adherents and to the prevailing academic view of Reconstruction at the time, that of the Dunning School, which maintained that it was a failure, and which deprecated the contributions of Black Americans. Gates describes Black Reconstruction as a "clarion call" for American Blacks that demonstrated they would not tolerate a historical narrative imposed on them and on their own history by white supremacists.

Charles Reagan Wilson, a historian and former director of the Center for the Study of Southern Culture at the University of Mississippi, has described how by the beginning of the second decade of the 21st century progressive African Americans and white southerners have succeeded in dismantling much of the collective memory of the Lost Cause in the South.

Scholar Peniel E. Joseph said in Time magazine that Du Bois, an African American author, civil rights activist, and Pan-Africanist, published Black Reconstruction in America in 1935 to expose the myths and lies of the Lost Cause. Du Bois wrote about African American excellence in business and politics, about Black progress in democracy, and how their success received white supremacy backlash.

According to the historian Kenneth M. Stampp, each side supported states' rights or stronger federal power only when convenient. He cited Confederate Vice President Alexander Stephens as a Southern leader who, when the war began, said that slavery was the "cornerstone of the Confederacy", but after the defeat of the Confederacy said, in A Constitutional View of the Late War Between the States, that the war had been not about slavery but about states' rights. Stephens became one of the most ardent defenders of the Lost Cause myth.

Similarly, the historian William C. Davis wrote of the Confederate Constitution's protection of slavery at the national level: "To the old Union they had said that the Federal power had no authority to interfere with slavery issues in a state. To their new nation they would declare that the state had no power to interfere with a federal protection of slavery. Of all the many testimonials to the fact that slavery, and not states' rights, really lay at the heart of their movement, this was the most eloquent of all."

Davis labeled many of the myths that surround the war "frivolous", including attempts to rename the war by Confederate partisans. He stated that names such as "War of Northern Aggression" and "War Between the States" (the latter expression having been coined by Alexander Stephens) were just attempts to deny the fact that the American Civil War was an actual civil war. He said, "Causes and effects of the war have been manipulated and mythologized to suit political and social agendas, past and present." Historian David Blight said a key to the Lost Cause is "its use of white supremacy as both means and ends". Historian Allan Nolan wrote: "[T]he Lost Cause legacy to history is a caricature of the truth. The caricature wholly misrepresents and distorts the facts of the matter. Surely it is time to start again in our understanding of this decisive element of our past and to do so from the premises of history unadulterated by the distortions, falsehoods, and romantic sentimentality of the Myth of the Lost Cause."

Wolfgang Schivelbusch described the American South's reaction to defeat as comparable to that of France after the Franco-Prussian War and Germany after the First World War, specifically with the myth and ideals of revanchism and the stab-in-the-back myth. Unlike the other two, which lost relevance after the French victory in World War I and Germany's defeat in World War II respectively, the Lost Cause continued as an important mythology. Schivelbusch, David M. Potter, Eugene Genovese, and Elizabeth Fox-Genovese speculated this was in part due to serving as an "other America" in contrast to American Capitalism comparably to Marxism.

=== "War Between the States" ===
The leaders of the Lost Cause movement began to emphasize the expression "War Between the States" at about the same time there was a shift in national usage from "War of the Rebellion" or the "Rebellion" to "Civil War". Southerners such as Vice President of the Confederate States Alexander H. Stephens defended the proposition that the Southern States had legitimately exercised a right to secede from the union. He preferred "War of Secession". The name "War Between the States" avoided the stigma associated with the term "rebellion" and affirmed the assertion that secession was legal and a constitutional right of the individual states who had confederated and were thus an independent nation.

Gaines M. Foster writes that almost no one used the expression "War of Northern Aggression" in the late 19th century. Stephens made passing reference to a "war of aggression", and other former Confederates mentioned the phrase "War of Coercion". A few white southerners insisted on the wording of "War Between the States", among them Jefferson Davis, who apologized when he committed the gaffe of using the words "Civil War". Regardless of these usages, "Civil War" remained the most commonly used name for the war by white southerners in the late 19th century.

== Cultural references ==
=== Statues by Moses Jacob Ezekiel ===
The Virginian Moses Jacob Ezekiel, the most prominent Confederate expatriate, was the only well-known sculptor to have seen action during the Civil War. From his studio in Rome, where a Confederate flag hung, he created a series of statues of Confederate "heroes" which both celebrated the Lost Cause in which he was a "true believer", and set a highly visible model for Confederate monument-erecting in the early 20th century.

According to journalist Lara Moehlman, "Ezekiel's work is integral to this sympathetic view of the Civil War". His Confederate statues included statues erected in Virginia, West Virginia, Ohio, and Kentucky.

Kali Holloway, director of the Make It Right Project, devoted to the removal of Confederate monuments, has said that:

What stands out most is the lasting impact of Ezekiel's tributes to the Confederacy—his homage to "Stonewall" Jackson in West Virginia; his "loyal slave" monument in Arlington; his personification of Virginia mourning for her soldiers who died fighting for a treasonous nation created in defense of black chattel slavery. Confederate monuments, including Ezekiel's highly visible sculptures, were part of a campaign to terrorize black Americans, to romanticize slavery, to promote an ahistorical lie about the honor of the Confederate cause, to cast in granite what Jim Crow codified in law. The consequences of all those things remain with us.

=== Thomas Dixon Jr.'s novels ===
An influential literary proponent of the Lost Cause was Thomas Dixon Jr. (1864–1946), a Southern lecturer, novelist, playwright, filmmaker, and Baptist minister.

Dixon, a North Carolinian, has been described as:

a professional racist who made his living writing books and plays attacking the presence of African Americans in the United States. A firm believer not only in white supremacy, but also in the "degeneration" of blacks after slavery ended, Dixon thought the ideal solution to America's racial problems was to deport all blacks to Africa.

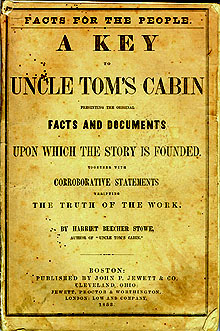
Thomas Dixon wrote works to counter the narratives in Uncle Tom's Cabin.

Dixon predicted a "race war" if current trends continued unchecked that he believed white people would surely win, having "3,000 years of civilization in their favor". He also considered efforts to educate and civilize African Americans futile, even dangerous, and said that an African American was "all right" as a slave or laborer "but as an educated man he is a monstrosity". In the short term, Dixon saw white racial prejudice as "self-preservation".

He was a noted lecturer, often getting many more invitations to speak than he was capable of accepting. Moreover, he regularly drew very large crowds, larger than any other Protestant preacher in the United States at the time, and newspapers frequently reported on his sermons and addresses. He resigned his minister's job to devote himself to lecturing full-time and supported his family that way. He had an immense following, and "his name had become a household word". In a typical review of the time, his talk was "decidedly entertaining and instructive [...] There were great beds of solid thought, and timely instruction at the bottom".

Between 1899 and 1903, he was heard by more than 5,000,000 people; his play The Clansman was seen by over 4,000,000. He was commonly referred to as the best lecturer in the country. He enjoyed a "handsome income" from lectures and royalties on his novels, especially from his share of The Birth of a Nation. He bought a "steam yacht" and named it Dixie.

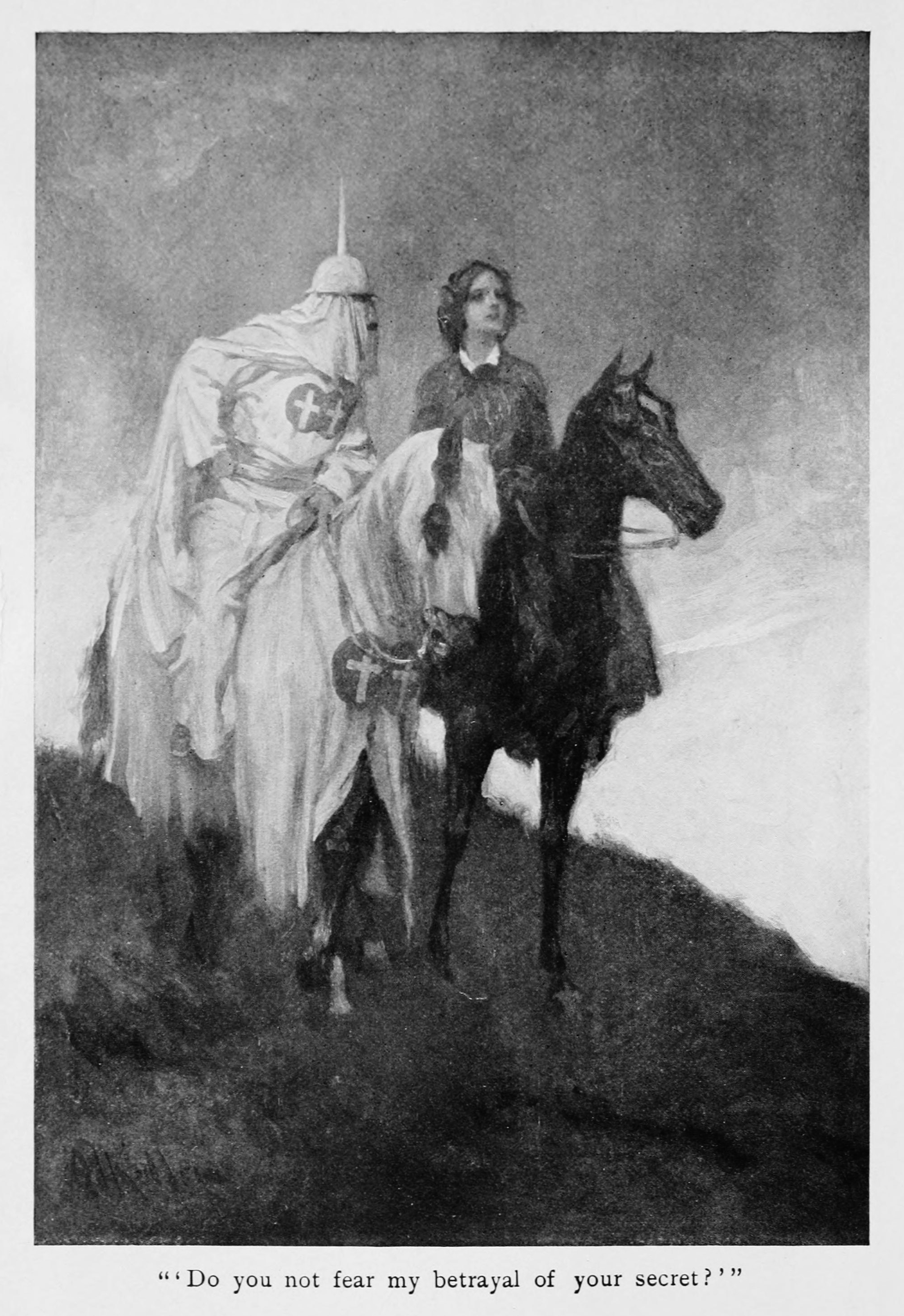
The front page to Thomas Dixon's The Clansman

After seeing a theatrical version of Uncle Tom's Cabin, "he became obsessed with writing a trilogy of novels about the Reconstruction period." The trilogy comprised The Leopard's Spots. A Romance of the White Man's Burden—1865–1900 (1902), The Clansman: A Historical Romance of the Ku Klux Klan (1905), and The Traitor: A Story of the Fall of the Invisible Empire (1907). "Each of his trilogy novels had developed that black-and-white battle through rape/lynching scenarios that are always represented as prefiguring total race war, should elite white men fail to resolve the nation's 'Negro Problem'." Dixon also wrote a novel about Abraham Lincoln—The Southerner (1913), "the story of what Davis called 'the real Lincoln'"—another, The Man in Grey (1921), on Robert E. Lee, and one on Jefferson Davis, The Victim (1914).

Dixon's method is hard-hitting, sensational, and uncompromising: it becomes easy to understand the reasons for the great popularity of these swiftly moving stories dealing with problems very close to people who had experienced the Civil War and Reconstruction; and thousands of persons who had experienced Reconstruction were still alive when the trilogy of novels was published. Dixon's literary skill in evoking old memories and deep-seated prejudices made the novelist a respected spokesman—a champion for people who held bitter resentments.

==== The Leopard's Spots ====
On the title page, Dixon cited Jeremiah 13:23: "Can the Ethiopian change his skin, or the leopard his spots?" He argued that just as the leopard cannot change his spots, the Negro cannot change his nature. The novel aimed to reinforce the superiority of the "Anglo-Saxon" race and advocate either for white dominance of black people or for the separation of the two races. Historian and Dixon biographer Richard Allen Cook writes, "the Negro, according to Dixon, is a brute, not a citizen: a child of a degenerate race brought from Africa." Dixon expounded the views in The Times of Philadelphia while he discussed the novel in 1902: "The negro is a human donkey. You can train him, but you can't make of him a horse."

==== The Clansman ====
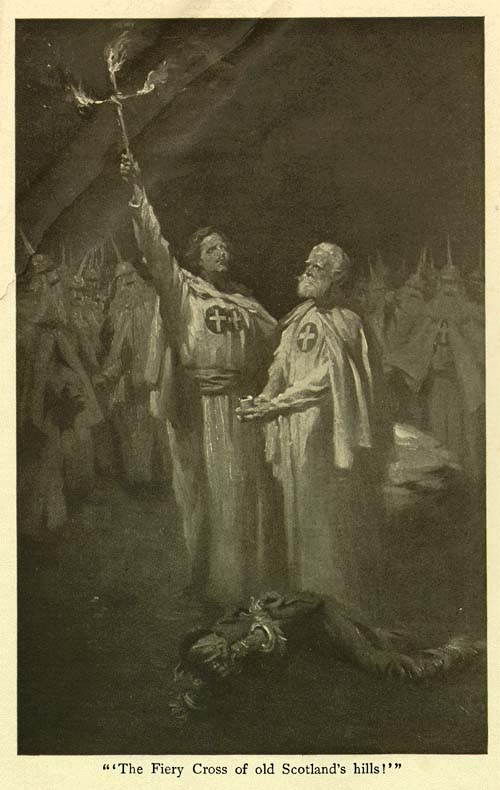
Arthur I. Keller made an illustration in the first edition of The Clansman.

In The Clansman: A Historical Romance of the Ku Klux Klan, the best known of the three novels, Dixon similarly claimed, "I have sought to preserve in this romance both the letter and the spirit of this remarkable period [...] The Clansman develops the true story of the 'Ku Klux Klan Conspiracy', which overturned the Reconstruction regime."

The depiction of the Klan's burning of crosses, as shown in the illustrations of the first edition, is an innovation of Dixon's. It had not previously been used by the Klan but was later taken up by them.

To publicize his views further, Dixon rewrote The Clansman as a play. Like the novel, it was a great commercial success; there were multiple touring companies presenting the play simultaneously in different cities. Sometimes, it was banned. The film Birth of a Nation is actually based on the play, rather than directly on the novel. In 1914, D.W. Griffith had become interested in The Clansman, and the two collaborated on the project which resulted in The Birth of a Nation.

=== The Birth of a Nation ===
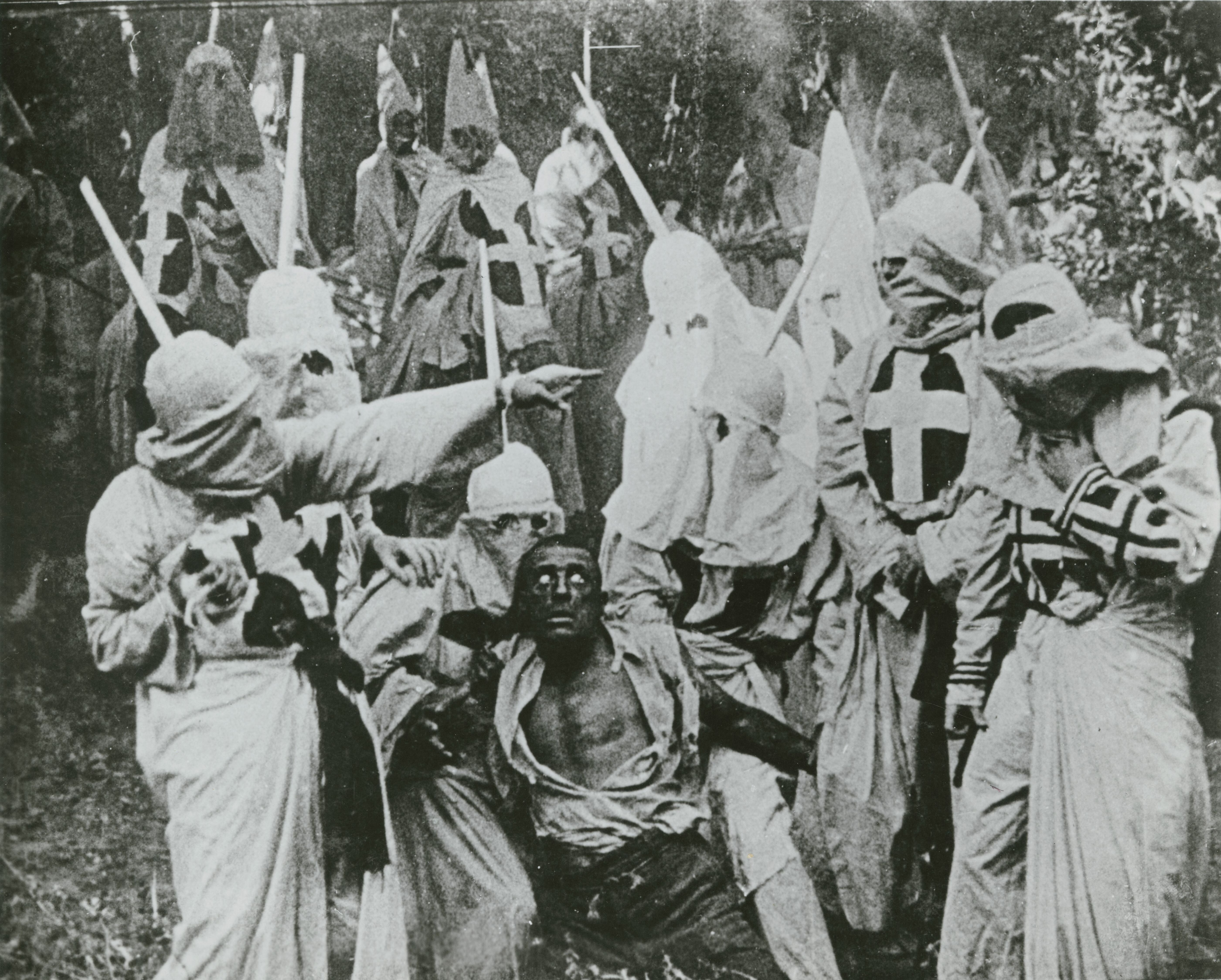
A group of Klansmen surround freedman Gus (played by white actor Walter Long in blackface) in a scene from director D. W. Griffith's 1915 Birth of a Nation.

Another prominent and influential popularizer of the Lost Cause perspective was D. W. Griffith's highly successful film The Birth of a Nation (1915), which was based on Dixon's novel. Noting that Dixon and Griffith collaborated on Birth of a Nation, Blight wrote:

Dixon's vicious version of the idea that blacks had caused the Civil War by their very presence, and that Northern radicalism during Reconstruction failed to understand that freedom had ushered blacks as a race into barbarism, neatly framed the story of the rise of heroic vigilantism in the South. Reluctantly, Klansmen—white men—had to take the law into their own hands to save Southern white womanhood from the sexual brutality of black men. Dixon's vision captured the attitude of thousands and forged in story form a collective memory of how the war may have been lost but Reconstruction was won—by the South and a reconciled nation. Riding as masked cavalry, the Klan stopped corrupt government, prevented the anarchy of 'Negro rule' and most of all, saved white supremacy.

In both The Clansman and the film, the Klan is portrayed as continuing the noble traditions of the antebellum South and the heroic Confederate soldier by defending Southern culture in general and Southern womanhood in particular against rape and depredations at the hands of the freedmen and Yankee carpetbaggers during Reconstruction.

The movie was the first film shown in the White House and was repeated the next day to the entire Supreme Court, 38 Senators, and the Secretary of the Navy. Dixon's narrative was so readily adopted that the film has been credited with the revival of the Klan in the 1910s and 1920s. The second Klan, which Dixon denounced, reached a peak membership of 2–5 million members.

The film's legacy is wide-reaching in the history of American racism, and even the now-iconic cross burnings of the KKK were based on Dixon's novel and the film made of it. The first KKK did not burn crosses, which was originally a Scottish tradition, "Crann Tara", designed to gather clans for war.

=== Later literature and films ===
The romanticization of the Lost Cause is captured in late 1930s and early 1940s films such as Gone With the Wind, So Red the Rose, Song of the South, and Tennessee Johnson—the last of which the San Francisco Chronicle called "the height of Southern mythmaking". Gods and Generals reportedly lionizes Jackson and Lee. CNN reported that these films "recast the antebellum South as a moonlight and magnolia paradise of happy slaves, affectionate slave owners and villainous Yankees".

==== Post-1920s literature ====
In his novels about the Sartoris family, William Faulkner referenced those who supported the Lost Cause ideal but suggested that the ideal itself was misguided and out of date.

The Confederate Veteran, a monthly magazine published in Nashville, Tennessee, from 1893 to 1932, made its publisher, Sumner Archibald Cunningham, a leader of the Lost Cause movement.

==== Gone with the Wind ====
The Lost Cause view reached tens of millions of Americans in the best-selling 1936 novel Gone with the Wind by Margaret Mitchell and the Oscar-winning 1939 film based on it. Helen Taylor wrote:

Gone with the Wind has almost certainly done its ideological work. It has sealed in popular imaginations a fascinated nostalgia for the glamorous southern plantation house and ordered hierarchical society in which slaves are "family" and there is a mystical bond between the landowner and the rich soil those slaves work for him. It has spoken eloquently—albeit from an elitist perspective—of the grand themes (war, love, death, conflicts of race, class, gender, and generation) that have crossed continents and cultures.

David W. Blight wrote:

From this combination of Lost Cause voices, a reunited America arose pure, guiltless, and assured that the deep conflicts in its past had been imposed upon it by otherworldly forces. The side that lost was especially assured that its cause was true and good. One of the ideas the reconciliationist Lost Cause instilled deeply into the national culture is that even when Americans lose, they win. Such was the message, the indomitable spirit, that Margaret Mitchell infused into her character Scarlett O'Hara in Gone With the Wind ...

Southerners were portrayed as noble, heroic figures, living in a doomed romantic society that rejected the realistic advice offered by the Rhett Butler character and never understood the risk that they were taking in going to war.

==== Song of the South ====
The 1946 Disney film Song of the South is the first to have combined live actors with animated shorts. In the framing story, the actor James Baskett played Uncle Remus, a former slave who apparently is full of joy and wisdom though having lived part of his life in slavery. There is a common misconception that the story takes place in the prewar period and that the African American characters are slaves. One critic writing for IndieWire said, "Like other similar films of the period also dealing with the antebellum South, the slaves in the film are all good-natured, subservient, annoyingly cheerful, content and always willing to help a white person in need with some valuable life lesson along the way. In fact, they're never called slaves, but they come off more like neighborly workers lending a helping hand for some kind, benevolent plantation owners." Disney has never released it on DVD and the film has been withheld from Disney+. It was released on VHS in the United Kingdom several times, most recently in 2000.

==== Gods and Generals ====
The 2003 Civil War film Gods and Generals, based on Jeff Shaara's 1996 novel, is widely viewed as championing the Lost Cause ideology with a presentation favorable to the Confederacy and lionizing Generals Jackson and Lee.

Writing in the Journal of American History, the historian Steven E. Woodworth derided the movie as a modern-day telling of Lost Cause mythology. Woodworth called the movie "the most pro-Confederate film since Birth of a Nation, a veritable celluloid celebration of slavery and treason":

Gods and Generals brings to the big screen the major themes of Lost Cause mythology that professional historians have been working for half a century to combat. In the world of Gods and Generals, slavery has nothing to do with the Confederate cause. Instead, the Confederates are nobly fighting for, rather than against, freedom, as viewers are reminded again and again by one white southern character after another.

Woodworth criticized the portrayal of slaves as being "generally happy" with their condition. He also criticized the relative lack of attention given to the motivations of Union soldiers fighting in the war. He excoriates the film for allegedly implying, in agreement with Lost Cause mythology, that the South was more "sincerely Christian". Woodworth concluded that the film through "judicious omission" presents "a distorted view of the Civil War".

The historian William B. Feis similarly criticized the director's decision "to champion the more simplistic-and sanitized-interpretations found in post-war 'Lost Cause' mythology". The film critic Roger Ebert described the movie as "a Civil War movie that Trent Lott might enjoy" and said of its Lost Cause themes, "If World War II were handled this way, there'd be hell to pay."

The consensus of film critics was that the movie had a "pro-Confederate slant".

== See also ==
=== Places and events ===
- List of Confederate monuments and memorials
- Blandford Church
- Confederate Memorial Day
- Confederate Memorial Hall
- Confederate Memorial Hall Museum

=== Nostalgia and pseudo-historical ideologies ===
- Stab-in-the-back myth
- Communist nostalgia – Eastern Europe and Russia
- Sociological Francoism – Spain
- Myth of the clean Wehrmacht – post-WWII Germany
- Revanchism

=== Other ===
- "The Conquered Banner"
- Kappa Alpha Order
- Names of the American Civil War
- Neo-Confederates
- Solid South
- Southern Democrats
- White nationalism
