= Marion B. Wilkinson =

African American suffragist, community activist, and clubwoman

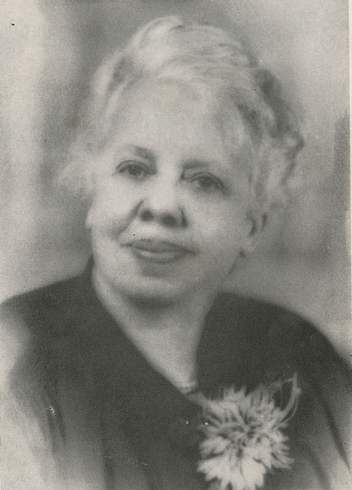
- Born: 1870; Charleston
- Died: September 19, 1956 (aged 85–86); Orangeburg
- Occupation: Suffragist
- Spouse(s): Robert Shaw Wilkinson

Marion B. Wilkinson (1870 – September 19, 1956) was an African American suffragist, community activist, and first president of the South Carolina Federation of Colored Women's Clubs.

== Early life and education ==
Marion Birnie Wilkinson was born in Charleston, South Carolina, in 1870, the eldest daughter of Richard and Anna Frost Birnie. Her family was part of Charleston's small but influential African American professional class during Reconstruction. Wilkinson attended the Avery Normal Institute, one of the first secondary schools for African Americans in the South, where she cultivated a strong sense of civic responsibility that later defined her activism. She graduated with high honors in 1888.

== Career ==
In 1890, Wilkinson became president of the Charleston branch of the Woman’s Christian Temperance Union (WCTU's) and represented the Women’s Auxiliary of St. Mark’s Church at the Annual Conference of Church Workers Among Colored People, where she delivered a speech on women’s work in the church.

In 1909, Wilkinson, along with Sara B. Henderson, Lizella A. Jenkins Moorer, and Cecelia Dial Saxon, founded the South Carolina Federation of Colored Women's Clubs, a prominent American women's club. Here within this club, founders encouraged black women to use their talents and passion to further educate the community around them over racial and social segregation. Wilkinson became the organization's first president and worked towards improving Black educational attainment and living conditions.

In 1911, Wilkinson and her husband moved to Orangeburg, South Carolina, where she started many community advocacy initiatives. Wilkinson and her husband founded St. Paul's Episcopal Mission, a Black Episcopal church. Wilkinson also founded the Sunshine Club, an Orangeburg women's service organization. Additionally, she began the Fairworld Home for Delinquent Girls, later renamed as the Marion Wilkinson Home for Girls. The South Carolina Federation of Colored Women's Clubs engaged in fundraising to support the Wilkinson Home for Girls.

Wilkinson was heavily involved in campus life at South Carolina State University. She was known as "Mother Wilkinson" and oversaw the women's dormitory. Furthermore, Wilkinson served as chief of the Young Women's Christian Association (YWCA), which resulted in the construction of the only YWCA building on a HBCU. While also heading the boarding department for YWCA, Wilkinson also ran the dining hall, worked with the Domestic Science Department, accommodated guests, and served as a mentor to students.

Wilkinson's service also expanded beyond South Carolina. Wilkinson was part of a group of Black women that organized recreation centers for servicemen in World War One. In the 1930s, she served as an advisor about child welfare programs for the Hoover administration. She also served as the third president of the National Association of Colored Women's Clubs.

== Personal life ==
Wilkinson was married to Dr. Robert Shaw Wilkinson, president of South Carolina State University (previously South Carolina State College). They had four children together.

She loved flowers, and played a substantial role in beautifying SCSU's campus.

== Death and legacy ==
Marion B. Wilkinson died on September 19, 1956, in Orangeburg, South Carolina, at the age of 85. Her lifelong advocacy for women’s education and racial equality left a lasting mark on South Carolina’s civic and educational institutions. The Marion Wilkinson Home for Girls continued to operate for years after her death, led by Mamie Garvin Fields and the South Carolina Federation of Colored Women's Clubs, in honor of her commitment to youth and community service.

In 2021, PBS ran a special titled SC Suffragists: Clubwomen, The Pollitzer Sisters, and the Vote that detailed her work.
