= Mamie Garvin Fields =

American teacher and civil rights activist

- Born: Mamie Elizabeth Garvin; July 13, 1888; Charleston, South Carolina
- Died: July 30, 1987 (aged 99); Charleston, South Carolina
- Education: Claflin College
- Occupations: Educator, Activist
- Notable work: Lemon Swamp and Other Places
- Spouse: Robert Lucas Fields

Mamie Garvin Fields (August 13, 1888 – July 30, 1987) was a teacher, civil rights and religious activist, and memoirist. In 1909, she became one of the first African-American teachers to be hired in a Charleston County, South Carolina, public school. She was also a co-founder of the Modern Priscilla Club of Charleston around 1925. (Note: The Modern Priscilla Club's exact year of creation is unknown as multiple sources list different years.)

== Early life ==
Mamie Elizabeth Garvin was born in Charleston, South Carolina, on August 13, 1888. She was the daughter of George Washington Garvin and Rebecca Mary Logan Bellinger. She attended school at Shaw, and then Claflin College. She received a licensure to teach and a diploma in science. She wanted to be a missionary but her parents wanted her to teach.

== After college ==
She began her teaching career in 1908 at Pine Wood, which was a predominantly black school at the time. On her return to Charleston in 1909, she became one of the first African-American teachers to be hired in a Charleston County public school. She later became principal of the Miller High School in Johns Island for two years.

After living in Boston for a few years, she returned to Charleston and married Robert Lucas Fields. The couple had two sons, Alfred Benjamin and Robert Lionel. In 1926, Fields returned to teaching at the Society Corner School. During the Depression, she founded the first vacation bible school for migrant workers in Charleston. Fields retired from teaching in 1943.

== Activist ==
In 1916, Fields joined the City of Charleston Federation of Colored Woman's Club. She co-founded the Modern Priscilla Club of Charleston in 1925 and served as the Club's first President. After retirement, Fields still remained active in women's clubs, and also volunteering in many civic and religious organizations. She was a member of the National Association of Colored Women's Clubs, whose mission was to “Lift as they Climb” through charitable, civic and other activities. She served as President of the South Carolina Federation of Colored Women's Clubs through 1958 to 1964 and was the Head (Note: Multiple sources list her actual job title differently, including "President," "Director," and "Superintendent" of the Wilkinson Home for Girls.) of the Marion Birnie Wilkinson Home for Girls (Note: The Marion Birnie Wilkinson Home for Girls has also been called the Fairworld Home for Delinquent Girls.) in Cayce, South Carolina. Her activism extended to the Charleston Chapter YWCA, where she was an active member. In 1969, Fields played a vital role in the opening of Charleston's first public daycare for working mothers after several children lost their lives in a house fire.

== Awards and recognition ==
Fields won awards from several organizations, including women's groups and black sororities. She won the award for the state's Outstanding Older Citizen from the South Carolina Commission on Aging.

Nearing her ninetieth birthday, she began working with her granddaughter, Karen Fields, on her memoir, Lemon Swamp and Other Places (1983). The memoir covers her life and work in South Carolina from 1888 to the present.

Fields died in Charleston on July 30, 1987.
