= Robert Shaw Wilkinson =

African American educator and second South Carolina State University President

- Born: February 18, 1865; Charleston
- Died: March 13, 1932 (aged 67); Orangeburg
- Alma mater: Oberlin College; Columbia University; Allen University
- Spouse(s): Marion B. Wilkinson

Robert Shaw Wilkinson (born 18 February 1865) was an educator and the second president of South Carolina State University. As president, Wilkinson instituted a building program and created a State Teacher Summer School. Before becoming president, Wilkinson taught at Kentucky State University and South Carolina State University.

== Early life ==
Wilkinson was born in Charleston, South Carolina on February 18, 1865, to Charles and Lavinia A. Wilkinson.

He attended the Avery Normal Institute in Charleston, South Carolina. In 1884, Wilkinson received an appointment at West Point Military Academy, but did not attend because he failed to pass the physical requirements. Later that year, Wilkinson entered an Oberlin College preparatory program and graduated with a Bachelor's degree in 1891. In 1904, he earned a Ph.D from Columbia University. In 1922, he earned a Doctor of Law from Allen University.

== Career ==
Before becoming a university president, Wilkinson taught at several institutions. In 1891, Wilkinson joined the Kentucky State University faculty, teaching Latin, Greek, and political science. In 1886, he was one of the first faculty members to join South Carolina State University (SCSU), where he taught mathematics, physics, and chemistry.

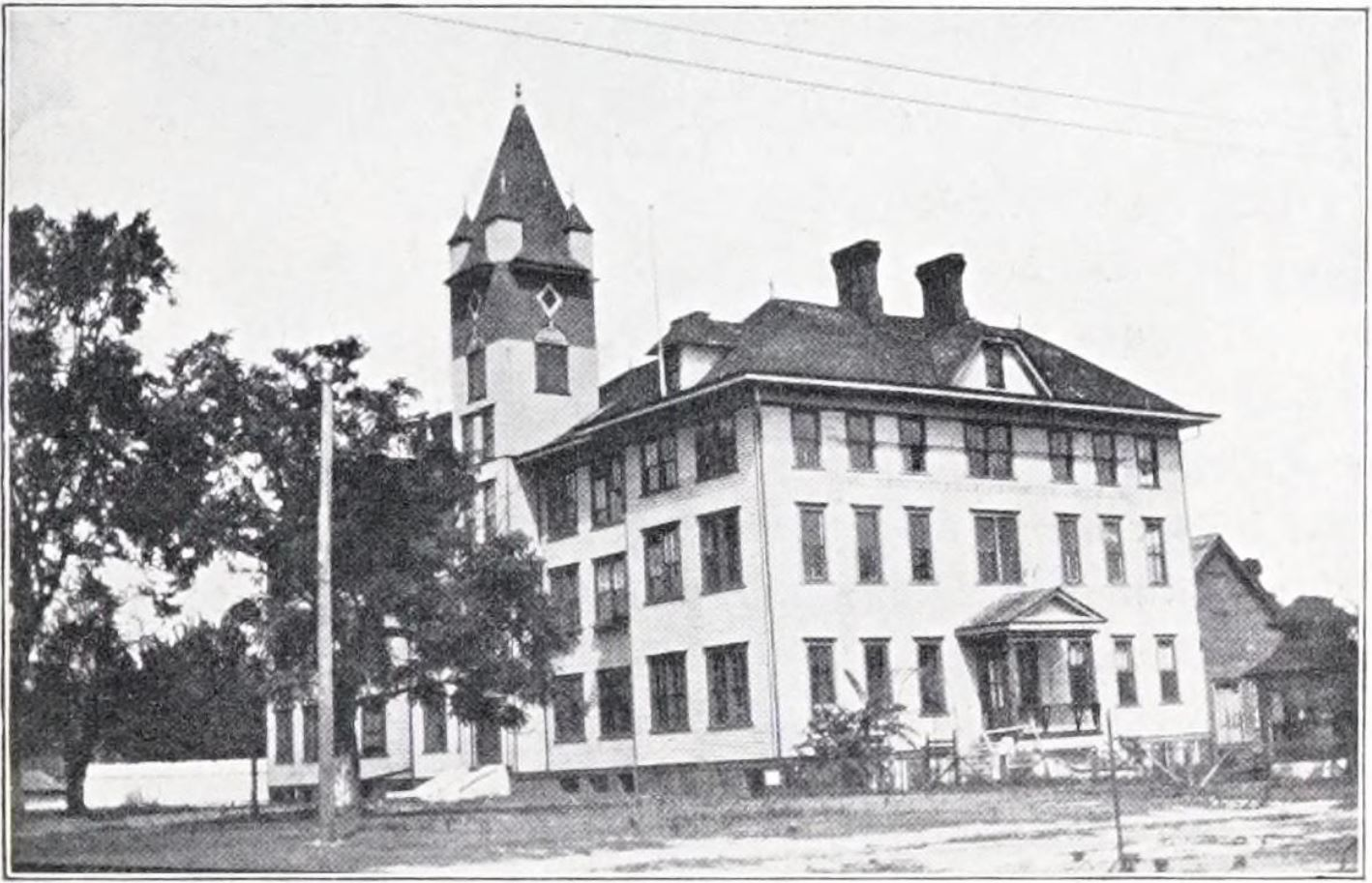
A school building at SCSU in 1910, while Wilkinson was a faculty member

In 1911, SCSU's first president, Thomas E. Miller, retired and Wilkinson became president. During his time as president, he instituted a building program in collaboration with Clemson University and Clafin College, as well as creating a State Teacher Summer School.

== Personal life ==
Wilkinson was married to Marion B. Wilkinson, an African American suffragist, community activist, and educator. They had four children together.

== Death and legacy ==
He died of pneumonia on March 13, 1932, in Orangeburg, South Carolina.

In 1938, Orangeburg's first black high school was named after Wilkinson.
