= South Carolina Federation of Colored Women's Clubs =

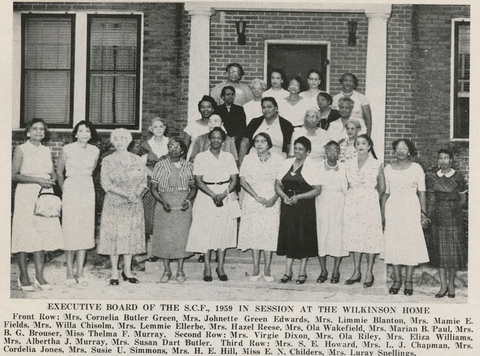
The Executive Board of the South Carolina Federation of Colored Women's Clubs in front of the Wilkinson Home in 1959.

The South Carolina Federation of Colored Women's Clubs (SCFCWC) was an African American women's club founded in 1909 in South Carolina. The umbrella organization was created by Marion Birnie Wilkinson, Sara B. Henderson, Lizella A. Jenkins Moorer, Celia Dial Saxon and other women who met at Sidney Park Church in Columbia. They adopted the motto of the National Association of Colored Women's Clubs (NACWC), "Lifting as We Climb." Wilkinson became the first president and worked towards improving education and living conditions for black people in South Carolina. Wilkinson later went on to serve as President Emeritus for the SCFCWC. The organization grew to have twenty-five hundred members in 1922. One of the major accomplishments of the SCFCWC was the creation of the Wilkinson Home for Colored Girls in Cayce in 1917. The home was originally for girls who had been deemed "delinquent" and later housed orphans.

The SCFCWC from the beginning aimed to improve education, hold an educational convention annually, protect women and children in the home and at work, further political security and rights, and promote interracial understanding. Black women at the time understood the importance of forming ties with white women in their fight for equality. The white women active in SCFCWC often were committed to improving African American lives, but they still upheld racial norms.

During the 1940s, Black women in South Carolina used the SCFCWC to further their goals of equal pay for teachers, voting rights, full citizenship, and support for middle-class black women. The SCFCWC worked to include African Americans in the political process.

SCFCWC also raised money for other organizations, including the Wilkinson Home for Girls, supporting causes and running food drives. The organization became a United Way agency in 1960.
