= Gilead (disambiguation) =

Gilead (Hebrew: גלעד) is the name of three persons and two places in the Bible.

Gilead may also refer to:

== Places ==
=== Australia ===
- Gilead, New South Wales, a suburb of Sydney

=== United States ===
- Gilead, Connecticut, a village in the town of Hebron
- Gilead, Illinois, an unincorporated community
- Gilead, Indiana, an unincorporated community
- Gilead, Maine, a town
  - Former Gilead Railroad Station, Maine, on the National Register of Historic Places
- Gilead Township, Michigan
- Gilead, Missouri, an unincorporated community
- Gilead, Nebraska, a village
- Lake Gilead, New York, a reservoir
- Gilead Township, Morrow County, Ohio

== People with the name ==
- Gilead Sher (born 1953), Israeli attorney, government official and peace negotiator
- Gilead J. Wilmot (1834–?), American politician

== Arts and entertainment ==
- Gil'ead, a city in the kingdom of Alagaësia in Christopher Paolini's novel Eragon
- Gilead, the fictional birthplace of Roland Deschain in Stephen King's The Dark Tower series of novels
- Republic of Gilead, the fictional totalitarian theocratic nation in Margaret Atwood's dystopian novel The Handmaid's Tale
- Gilead (novel), a 2004 novel by Marilynne Robinson
- Gilead, a novelette by Zenna Henderson in her Ingathering series

== Other uses ==
- Gilead Sciences, an American biopharmaceutical company based in California
- Watchtower Bible School of Gilead, Jehovah's Witnesses' missionary training program in New York state, a.k.a. the Gilead School
- Gilead (tribal group), mentioned in the Bible
- Gilead, a Jaredite military commander in the Book of Mormon

== See also ==
- Mount Gilead (disambiguation)
- Ghilad, a commune in Timiș County, Romania
- Gilad (disambiguation)
- Balm of Gilead (disambiguation)
