= Mount Gilead =

Mount Gilead may refer to:

- The Mount of Gilead, in the Bible
- Mount Gilead, a pioneer estate now located in Gilead, New South Wales
- Mount Gilead, North Carolina
  - Mount Gilead Downtown Historic District
- Mount Gilead, Ohio
  - Mount Gilead High School
  - Mount Gilead State Park
  - Mount Gilead-Mansfield Road
  - Mount Gilead-Mount Vernon Road
- Mount Gilead, Tennessee
- Mount Gilead, Virginia
- Mount Gilead Estate, a retirement community near Campbelltown, South Australia

== See also ==
- Gilead (disambiguation)
