= Balm =

Balm may refer to:

== Places ==
- Balm, Alberta, Canada
- Balm, Meiringen, Bern, Switzerland
- Balm bei Günsberg, Solothurn, Switzerland
- Balm bei Messen, Solothurn, Switzerland
- Balm, Florida, U.S.

== Plants ==
- Melissa (plant), or balm, a genus of perennial herbs
  - Lemon balm (Melissa officinalis)
- Field balm
- Nepeta
  - Field Balm (catnip)
- Melittis, Bastard Balm
- Monarda, a genus of flowering plants, many species of which are known as bee balm
- Elsholtzia ciliata, or Vietnamese balm
- Cedronella, Canary Balm or Balm-of-Gilead

== Other uses ==
- Liniment, a medicated topical preparation for application to the skin
- BALM Paints, an Australian paint manufacturer taken over by Dulux

== See also ==
- Balm of Gilead (disambiguation)
- Balsam (disambiguation)
