= Styrene =

Chemical compound

- Styrene

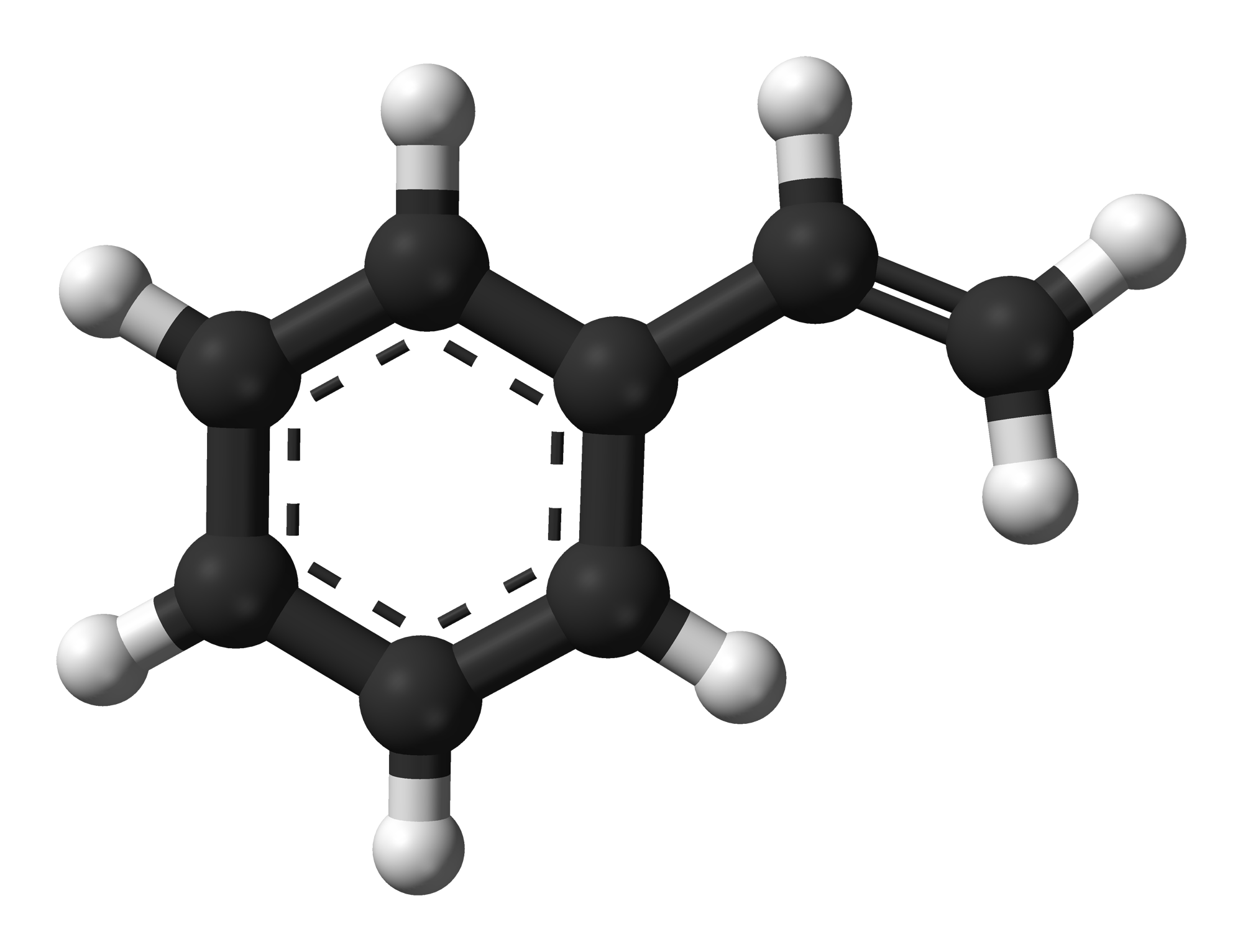

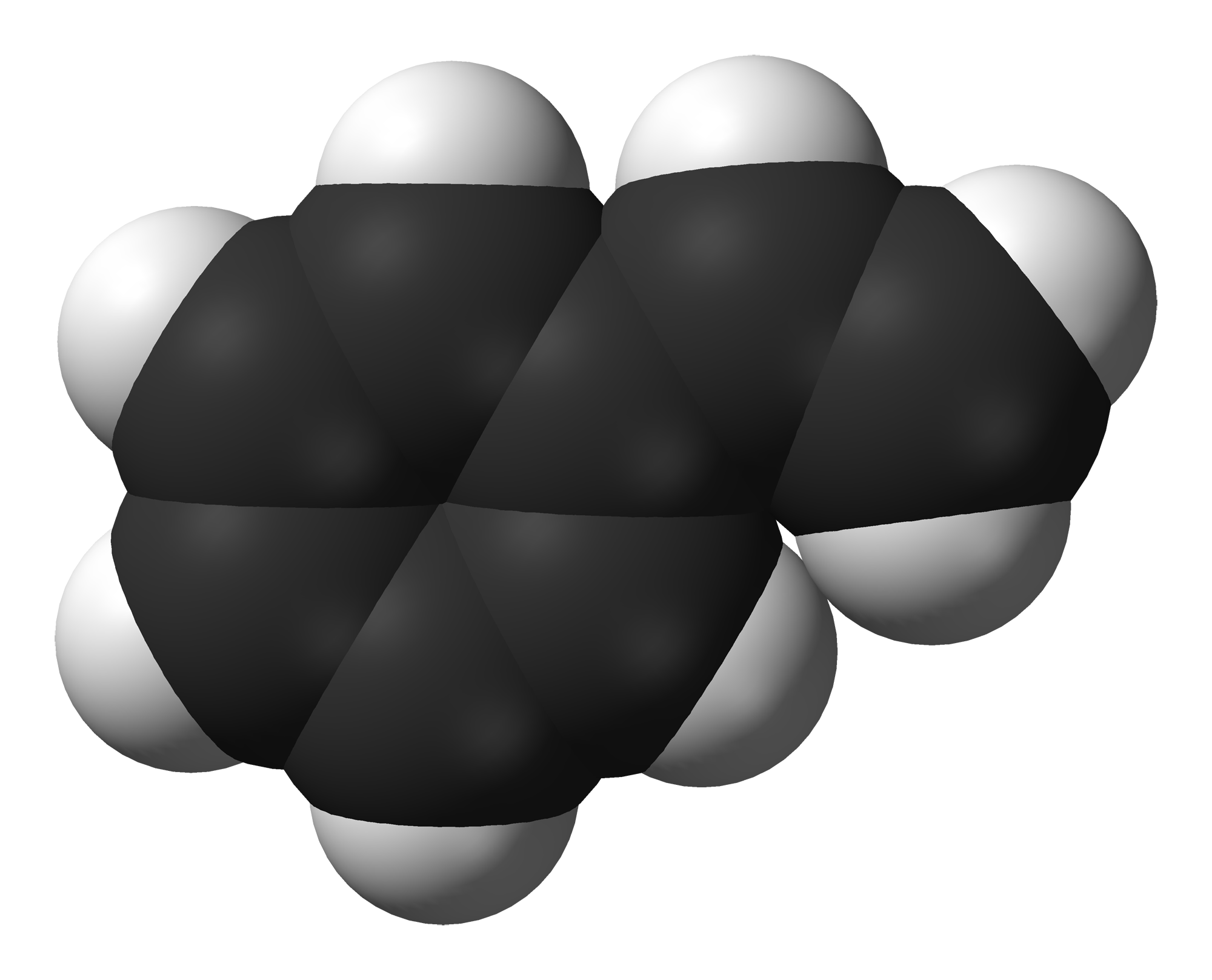

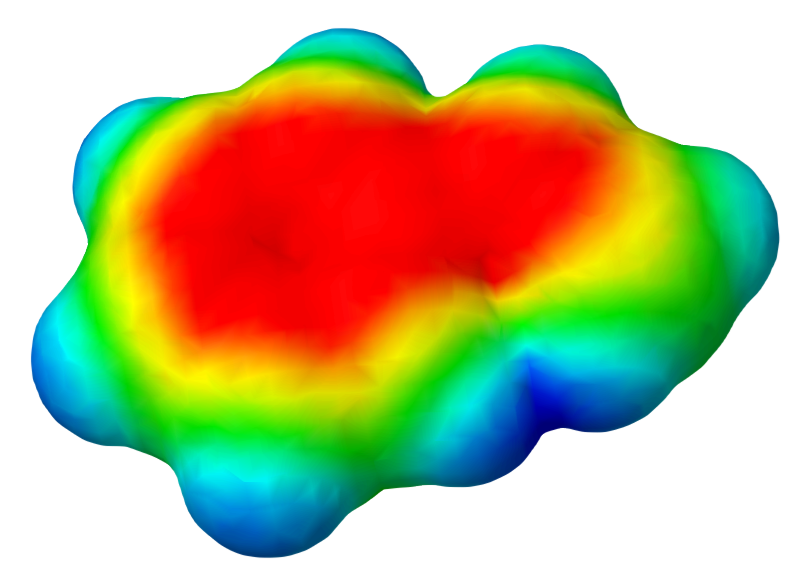

Names
- Preferred IUPAC name Ethenylbenzene
- Other names Styrene; Vinylbenzene; Phenylethene; Phenylethylene; Cinnamene; Styrol; Diarex HF 77; Styrolene; Styropol

Identifiers
CAS Number	100-42-5
3D model (JSmol)	Interactive image
Beilstein Reference	1071236
ChEBI	CHEBI:27452
ChEMBL	ChEMBL285235
ChemSpider	7220
ECHA InfoCard	100.002.592
EC Number	202-851-5
Gmelin Reference	2991
KEGG	C07083
PubChem CID	7501
RTECS number	WL3675000
UNII	44LJ2U959V
UN number	2055
CompTox Dashboard (EPA)	DTXSID2021284
- InChI: InChI=1S/C8H8/c1-2-8-6-4-3-5-7-8/h2-7H,1H2 Key: PPBRXRYQALVLMV-UHFFFAOYSA-N
- SMILES: c1ccccc1C=C

Properties
Chemical formula	C_{8}H_{8}
Molar mass	104.15 g/mol
Appearance	colorless oily liquid
Odor	sweet and floral
Density	0.909 g/cm^{3}
Melting point	−30 °C (−22 °F; 243 K)
Boiling point	145 °C (293 °F; 418 K)
Solubility in water	0.03% (20 °C)
log P	2.70
Vapor pressure	5 mmHg (20 °C)
Magnetic susceptibility (χ)	−6.82×10^{−5} cm^{3}/mol
Refractive index (n_{D})	1.5469
Viscosity	0.762 cP at 20 °C

Structure
Dipole moment	0.13 D

Hazards
- Occupational safety and health (OHS/OSH)
Main hazards	flammable, toxic, probably carcinogenic
- GHS labelling
Pictograms	(GHS02: Flammable) (GHS07: Exclamation mark) (GHS08: Health hazard)
Signal word	Danger
Hazard statements	H226, H315, H319, H332, H361, H372
Precautionary statements	P201, P202, P210, P233, P240, P241, P242, P243, P260, P264, P270, P271, P280, P281, P302+P352, P303+P361+P353, P304+P312, P304+P340, P305+P351+P338, P308+P313, P312, P314, P321, P332+P313, P337+P313, P362, P370+P378, P403+P235, P405, P501
NFPA 704 (fire diamond)	2 3 2
Flash point	31 °C (88 °F; 304 K)
Explosive limits	0.9–6.8%
- Lethal dose or concentration (LD, LC)
LC_{50} (median concentration)	2194 ppm (mouse, 4 h); 5543 ppm (rat, 4 h)
LC_{Lo} (lowest published)	10,000 ppm (human, 30 min); 2771 ppm (rat, 4 h)
- NIOSH (US health exposure limits)
PEL (Permissible)	TWA 100 ppm C 200 ppm 600 ppm (5-minute maximum peak in any 3 hours)
REL (Recommended)	TWA 50 ppm (215 mg/m^{3}); ST 100 ppm (425 mg/m^{3})
IDLH (Immediate danger)	700 ppm
Safety data sheet (SDS)	SDS

Related compounds
Related styrenes; related aromatic compounds	polystyrene, stilbene; ethylbenzene
- Except where otherwise noted, data are given for materials in their standard state (at 25 °C [77 °F], 100 kPa). verify (what is ?) Infobox references

Styrene is an organic compound with the chemical formula C_{6}H_{5}CH=CH_{2}. Its structure consists of a vinyl group as substituent on benzene. Styrene is a colorless, oily liquid, although aged samples can appear yellowish. The compound evaporates easily and has a sweet smell, although high concentrations have a less pleasant odor. Styrene is the precursor to polystyrene and several copolymers, and is typically made from benzene for this purpose. Approximately 25 million tonnes of styrene were produced in 2010, increasing to around 35 million tonnes by 2018.

== Natural occurrence ==
Styrene is named after storax balsam (often commercially sold as styrax), the resin of Liquidambar trees of the Altingiaceae plant family. Styrene occurs naturally in small quantities in some plants and foods (cinnamon, coffee beans, balsam trees and peanuts) and is also found in coal tar.

== History ==
In 1839, the German apothecary Eduard Simon isolated a fragrant volatile liquid from the resin (called storax or styrax (Latin)) of the American sweetgum tree (Liquidambar styraciflua). He called the liquid "styrol" (now called styrene). He also noticed that when styrol was exposed to air, light, or heat, it gradually transformed into a hard, rubber-like substance, which he called "styrol oxide".

By 1845, the German chemist August Wilhelm von Hofmann and his student John Buddle Blyth had determined styrene's empirical formula: C_{8}H_{8}. They had also determined that Simon's "styrol oxide"—which they renamed "metastyrol"—had the same empirical formula as styrene. Furthermore, they could obtain styrene by dry-distilling "metastyrol".

In 1865, the German chemist Emil Erlenmeyer found that styrene could form a dimer, and in 1866 the French chemist Marcelin Berthelot stated that "metastyrol" was a polymer of styrene (i.e. polystyrene). Meanwhile, other chemists had been investigating another component of storax, namely, cinnamic acid. They had found that cinnamic acid could be decarboxylated to form "cinnamene" (or "cinnamol"), which appeared to be styrene.

In 1845, French chemist Emil Kopp suggested that the two compounds were identical, and in 1866, Erlenmeyer suggested that both "cinnamol" and styrene might be vinylbenzene. However, the styrene that was obtained from cinnamic acid seemed different from the styrene that was obtained by distilling storax resin: the latter was optically active. Eventually, in 1876, the Dutch chemist van 't Hoff resolved the discrepancy: the optical activity of the styrene that was obtained by distilling storax resin was due to a contaminant.

== Industrial production ==
=== From ethylbenzene ===
The vast majority of styrene is produced from ethylbenzene, and almost all ethylbenzene produced worldwide is intended for styrene production. As such, the two production processes are often highly integrated. Ethylbenzene is produced via a Friedel–Crafts reaction between benzene and ethylene; originally this used aluminum chloride as a catalyst, but in modern production this has been replaced by zeolites.

==== By dehydrogenation ====
Around 80% of styrene is produced by the dehydrogenation of ethylbenzene. This is achieved using superheated steam (up to 600 °C) over an iron(III) oxide catalyst. The reaction is highly endothermic and reversible, with a typical yield of 88–94%.

The crude ethylbenzene/styrene product is then purified by distillation. As the difference in boiling points between the two compounds is only 9 °C at ambient pressure this necessitates the use of a series of distillation columns. This is energy intensive and is further complicated by the tendency of styrene to undergo thermally induced polymerisation into polystyrene, requiring the continuous addition of polymerization inhibitor to the system.

==== Via ethylbenzene hydroperoxide ====
Styrene is also co-produced commercially in a process known as POSM (Lyondell Chemical Company) or SM/PO (Shell) for styrene monomer / propylene oxide. In this process, ethylbenzene is treated with oxygen to form the ethylbenzene hydroperoxide. This hydroperoxide is then used to oxidize propylene to propylene oxide, which is also recovered as a co-product. The remaining 1-phenylethanol is dehydrated to give styrene:

=== Other industrial routes ===
==== Pyrolysis gasoline extraction ====
Extraction from pyrolysis gasoline is performed on a limited scale.

==== From toluene and methanol ====
Styrene can be produced from toluene and methanol, which are cheaper raw materials than those in the conventional process. This process has suffered from low selectivity associated with the competing decomposition of methanol. Exelus Inc. claims to have developed this process with commercially viable selectivities, at 400–425 °C and atmospheric pressure, by forcing these components through a proprietary zeolitic catalyst. It is reported that an approximately 9:1 mixture of styrene and ethylbenzene is obtained, with a total styrene yield of over 60%.

==== From benzene and ethane ====
Another route to styrene involves the reaction of benzene and ethane. This process is being developed by Snamprogetti and Dow. Ethane, along with ethylbenzene, is fed to a dehydrogenation reactor with a catalyst capable of simultaneously producing styrene and ethylene. The dehydrogenation effluent is cooled and separated and the ethylene stream is recycled to the alkylation unit. The process attempts to overcome previous shortcomings in earlier attempts to develop production of styrene from ethane and benzene, such as inefficient recovery of aromatics, production of high levels of heavies and tars, and inefficient separation of hydrogen and ethane. Development of the process is ongoing.

== Laboratory synthesis ==
A laboratory synthesis of styrene entails the decarboxylation of cinnamic acid with catalytic hydroquinone:

C_{6}H_{5}CH=CHCO_{2}H → C_{6}H_{5}CH=CH_{2} + CO_{2}

Styrene was first prepared by this method.

== Polymerization ==
The presence of the vinyl group allows styrene to polymerize. Commercially significant products include polystyrene, acrylonitrile butadiene styrene (ABS), styrene-butadiene rubber (SBR), styrene-butadiene latex, SIS (styrene-isoprene-styrene), S-EB-S (styrene-ethylene/butylene-styrene), styrene-divinylbenzene (S-DVB), styrene-acrylonitrile resin (SAN), and unsaturated polyesters used in resins and thermosetting compounds. These materials are used in rubber, plastic, insulation, fiberglass, pipes, automobile and boat parts, food containers, and carpet backing.

== Hazards ==
=== Autopolymerisation ===
As a liquid or a gas, pure styrene will polymerise spontaneously to polystyrene, without the need of external initiators. This is known as autopolymerisation. At 100 °C it will autopolymerise at a rate of ~2% per hour, and more rapidly than this at higher temperatures. As the autopolymerisation reaction is exothermic it can be self-accelerating, with a real risk of a thermal runaway, potentially leading to an explosion. Examples include the 2019 explosion of the tanker Stolt Groenland, explosions at the Phillips Petroleum Company in 1999 and 2000 and overheating styrene tanks leading to the 2020 Visakhapatnam gas leak, which killed several people. The autopolymerisation reaction can only be kept in check by the continuous addition of polymerisation inhibitors such as butylated hydroxytoluene.

=== Health effects ===
Styrene is regarded as a "known carcinogen", especially in case of eye contact, but also in case of skin contact, of ingestion and of inhalation, according to several sources. Styrene is largely metabolized into styrene oxide in humans, resulting from oxidation by cytochrome P450. Styrene oxide is considered toxic, mutagenic, and possibly carcinogenic. Styrene oxide is subsequently hydrolyzed in vivo to styrene glycol by the enzyme epoxide hydrolase. The US Environmental Protection Agency (EPA) has described styrene to be "a suspected toxin to the gastrointestinal tract, kidney, and respiratory system, among others".

On 10 June 2011, the US National Toxicology Program has described styrene as "reasonably anticipated to be a human carcinogen". However, a STATS author describes a review that was done on scientific literature and concluded that "The available epidemiologic evidence does not support a causal relationship between styrene exposure and any type of human cancer". Despite this claim, work has been done by Danish researchers to investigate the relationship between occupational exposure to styrene and cancer. They concluded, "The findings have to be interpreted with caution, due to the company based exposure assessment, but the possible association between exposures in the reinforced plastics industry, mainly styrene, and degenerative disorders of the nervous system and pancreatic cancer, deserves attention". In 2012, the Danish EPA concluded that the styrene data do not support a cancer concern for styrene. The US EPA does not have a cancer classification for styrene, but it has been the subject of their Integrated Risk Information System (IRIS) program.

The National Toxicology Program of the US Department of Health and Human Services has determined that styrene is "reasonably anticipated to be a human carcinogen". Various regulatory bodies refer to styrene, in various contexts, as a possible or potential human carcinogen. The International Agency for Research on Cancer considers styrene to be "probably carcinogenic to humans".

The neurotoxic properties of styrene have also been studied and reported effects include effects on vision (although unable to reproduce in a subsequent study) and on hearing functions. Studies on rats have yielded contradictory results, but epidemiologic studies have observed a synergistic interaction with noise in causing hearing difficulties.
