= Hans Bruyninckx =

Belgian political scientist (born 1964)

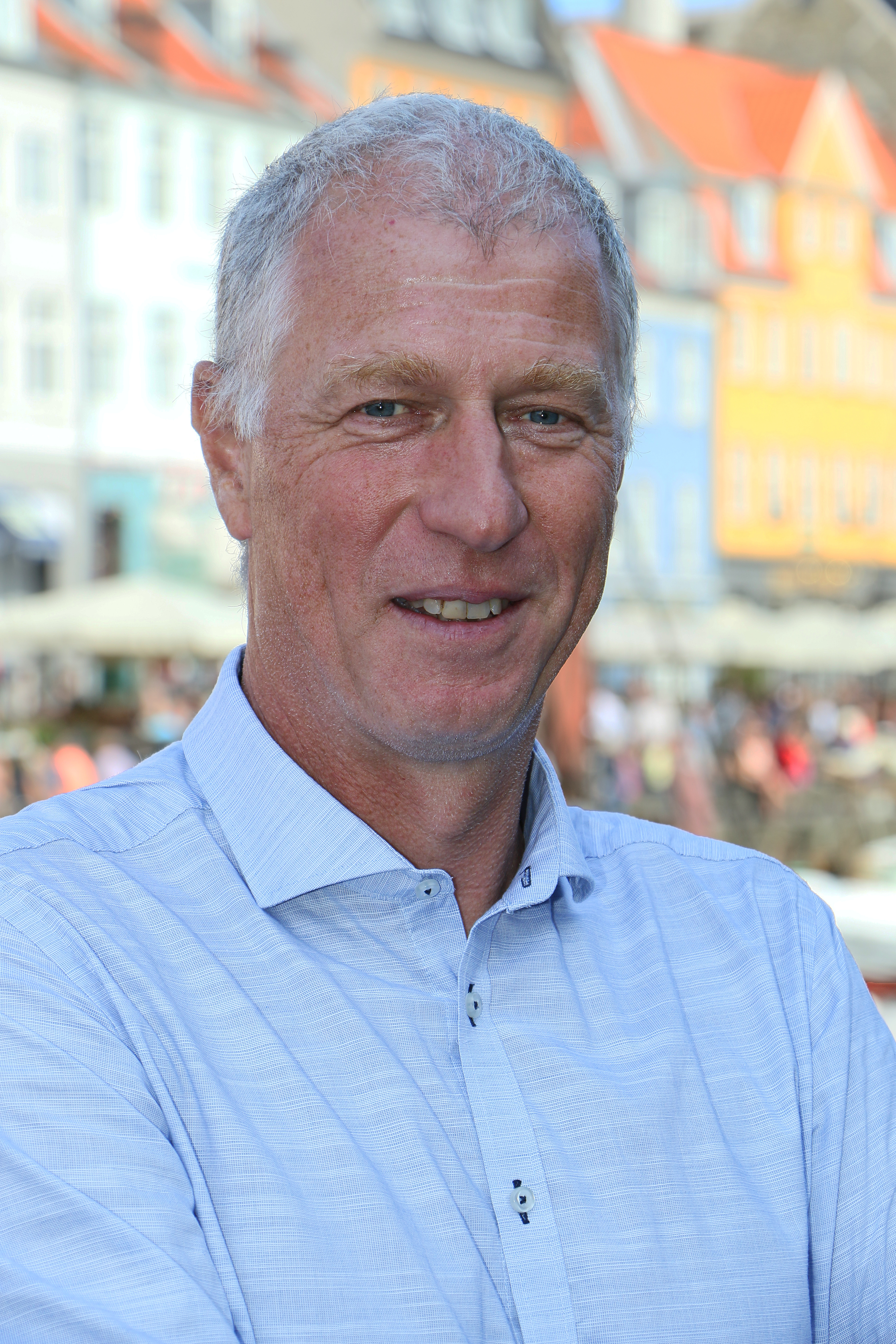
- Born: March 20, 1964 (age 62); Schoten, Belgium
- Education: Colorado State University; UCLouvain; KU Leuven; University of Antwerp
- Scientific career
- Fields: Political science; international relations; EU environmental policy; environmental governance; environmental politics
- Workplaces: European Environment Agency; KU Leuven; Wageningen University
- Thesis: Environmental degradation and violent social conflict: a theoretical framework of analysis (1996)

Hans Emiel Aloysius Bruyninckx (Dutch: [ɦɑnz ˈbrœynɪŋks]; born March 20, 1964) is a Belgian political scientist and international relations scholar specialized in international environmental governance and European environmental politics. He has headed the European Environment Agency since 2013. While in this position, he is on leave from his posts as Professor of International Relations and Global Environmental Governance, Institute for International and European Policy; and Director, Research Institute for Work and Society, both at the Katholieke Universiteit Leuven (KU Leuven).

== Education ==
Bruyninckx studied political science focused on international relations at Antwerp University and KU Leuven. He obtained an additional degree in development studies at the University of Louvain (UCLouvain) and, subsequently, earned his PhD degree in 1996 at Colorado State University on the topic of international environmental politics.

== Career ==
Bruyninckx taught at several other universities such as Colorado State University, Canisius College, and Wageningen University.

Bruyninckx´ academic expertise lies in international environmental policy, studying the effects of globalization on the global governance of environmental issues and sustainable development. He studied global production and consumption systems, and environmental justice. He has been teaching at the university on the topic of global environmental politics, and global environmental governance in relation to the European Union. As of 2010, besides his main appointments at the university, he has been a senior member of the interdisciplinary Leuven Centre for Global Governance Studies, promoter-coordinator of the Flemish Support Point on Transitions for Sustainable Development (TRADO), and president of the Flemish umbrella environmental organisation Bond Beter Leefmilieu.

In June 2013, Bruyninckx became Executive Director of the European Environment Agency, succeeding Jacqueline McGlade.

After the EEA published a report in 2016, he was quoted saying "that there was now not a snowball’s chance in hell of limiting global warming to 2C without the full involvement of the US."

== Key publications ==
- "The role of societal groups in bringing about a policy of sustainable development," Sustainable Development Towards a Sustainable Dialogue between Science and Policy. Brussels, 24–25 November 1999. Brussels: OSTC, 2000, pp. 160–171.
- "Participatory input and questions of legitimacy: the role and function of advisory bodies in the construction and use of sustainability indicators," Environmental Indicators and Sustainable Development Trends. Annual Conference of European Environmental Advisory Councils (EEAC). Gent, Belgium, 15–18 November 2001. MiNa-Council, pp. 113–121
- "The implementation of the desert convention: case Ouahigouya, Burkina Faso," Global Environmental Politics 4 (3), 107–127, 2004.
- "Sustainable development: the institutionalization of a contested policy concept." In: Betsill, M.; Hochstetler, K.; Stevis, D. (Eds.), Palgrave Advances in International Environmental Politics. New York: Palgrave Macmillan, 2005, pp. 265–298. ISBN 1403921075
- "China and global environmental governance". In: Lectures for the XXIst Century. Leuven: Leuven University Press, 2008, pp. 165–185.
- "Environmental evaluation practices and the issue of scale," New Directions for Evaluation (122), 31–39, 2009.

With others

- Spaargaren, G.; Mol, A.P.J.; and Bruyninckx, H. (2006). "Introduction: governing environmental flows in global modernity". In: Spaargaren, G.; Mol, A.P.J.; and Buttel, F.H. (Eds.), Governing Environmental Flows: Global Challenges to Social Theory. Cambridge, MA: MIT Press, pp. 1–36. ISBN 978-0262195454
- Wouters, J.; Bruyninckx, H.; Keukeleire, S.; Corthout, T.; Basu, S.; and Schunz, S. (2010). "The European Union and multilateral governance - an interdisciplinary research project. Research notes (Part 3)," Journal of Contemporary European Research 6 (3), 412–418.
- Happaerts, S.; Brande, K. van den; and Bruyninckx, H. (2011). "Subnational governments in transnational networks for sustainable development," International Environmental Agreements 11 (4), 321–339.
- Wouters, J.; Bruyninckx, H.; Basu, S.; and Schunz S. (Eds.), The European Union and Multilateral Governance. Assessing EU Participation in United Nations Human Rights and Environmental Fora. Basingstoke: Palgrave Macmillan, 2012. ISBN 978-0230282315
- Bruyninckx, H., Happaerts, S., Brande, K. van den. (Eds.), Sustainable Development and Subnational Governments: Policy-making and Multi-level Interactions. Basingstoke: Palgrave Macmillan, 2012. ISBN 978-0230360525
- Bruyninckx, H., Qi, Y.; Nguyen, Q.T.; and Belis, D. (Eds.), The Governance of Climate Relations between Europe and Asia: Evidence from China and Vietnam as Key Emerging Economies. Cheltenham and Northampton, MA: Edward Elgar, 2014. ISBN 978-1781955987

== See also ==
- Bond Beter Leefmilieu (Union for a Better Environment) (in Dutch)
