= European Environment Agency =

Agency of the European Union

Agency overview
- Formed: 30 October 1993
- Jurisdiction: European Union
- Headquarters: Copenhagen, Denmark; 55°40′52″N 12°35′12″E
- Agency executives: Leena Ylä-Mononen, Executive Director; Laura Burke, Chairwoman of Management Board
- Key document: Regulation (EC) No 401/2009
- Website: www.eea.europa.eu

Map
- European Environment Agency (European Union)

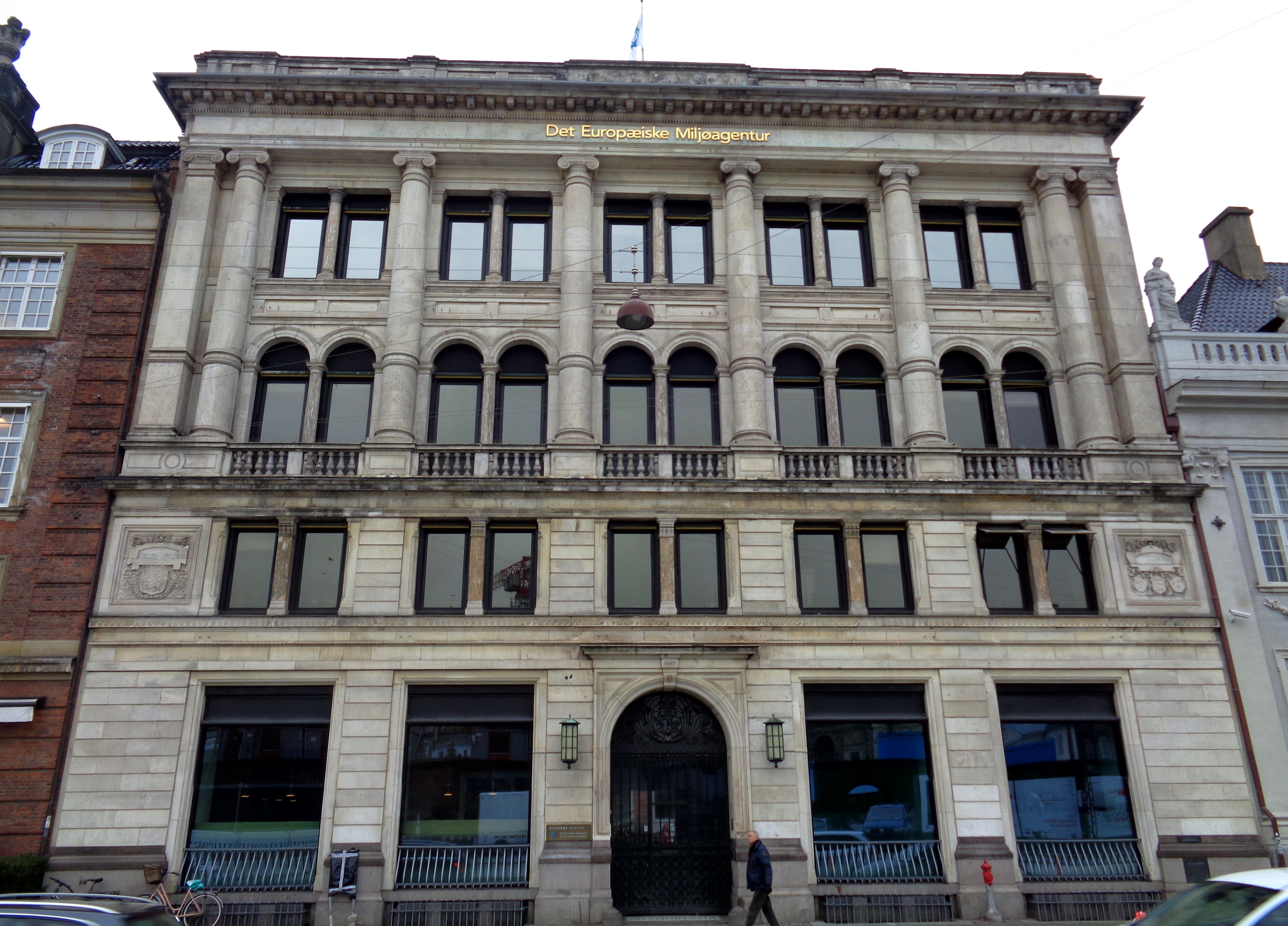
European Environment Agency Building in Copenhagen in winter

The European Environment Agency (EEA) is the agency of the European Union (EU) which provides independent information on the environment in climate policy, biodiversity conservation and other environmental goals set by the country.

== Definition ==
The European Environment Agency (EEA) is the agency of the European Union (EU) which provides independent information on the environment. Its goal is to help those involved in developing, implementing and evaluating environmental policy, and to inform the general public.

== Organization ==
The EEA was established by the European Economic Community (EEC) Regulation 1210/1990 (amended by EEC Regulation 933/1999 and EC Regulation 401/2009) and became operational in 1994, headquartered in Copenhagen, Denmark.

The agency is governed by a management board composed of representatives of the governments of its 32 member states, a European Commission representative and two scientists appointed by the European Parliament, assisted by its Scientific Committee.

The current Executive Director of the agency is Leena Ylä-Mononen, who has been appointed for a five-year term, starting on 1 June 2023. Ms Ylä-Mononen is the successor of professor Hans Bruyninckx.

== Member countries ==
The member states of the European Union are members; however other states may become members of it by means of agreements concluded between them and the EU.

It was the first EU body to open its membership to the 13 candidate countries (pre-2004 enlargement).

The EEA has 32 member countries and seven cooperating countries. The members are the 27 European Union member states together with Iceland, Liechtenstein, Norway, Switzerland and Turkey.

Since Brexit in 2020, the UK is not a member of the EU anymore and therefore not a member state of the EEA.

Eight EU candidate countries are cooperating countries: Albania, Bosnia and Herzegovina, Moldova, Montenegro, North Macedonia, Serbia, Ukraine as well as Kosovo under the UN Security Council Resolution 1244/99. These cooperation activities are integrated into Eionet and are supported by the EU under the "Instrument for Pre-Accession Assistance".

The EEA is an active member of the EPA Network.

EU Member countries	non-EU Member countries	Cooperating countries
Austria	Iceland	Albania
Belgium	Liechtenstein	Bosnia and Herzegovina
Bulgaria	Norway	Kosovo (Note: under the UN Security Council Resolution 1244/99)
Croatia	Switzerland	Moldova
Czech Republic	Turkey	Montenegro
Cyprus		North Macedonia
Denmark		Serbia
Estonia		Ukraine
Finland
France
Germany
Greece
Hungary
Ireland
Italy
Latvia
Lithuania
Luxembourg
Malta
Netherlands
Poland
Portugal
Romania
Slovakia
Slovenia
Spain
Sweden

== Reports, data and knowledge ==
The European Environment Agency (EEA) produces assessments based on quality-assured data on a wide range of issues from biodiversity, air quality, transport to climate change. These assessments are closely linked to the European Union's environment policies and legislation and help monitor progress in some areas and indicate areas where additional efforts are needed.

As required in its founding regulation, the EEA publishes its flagship report the State and Outlook of Europe's environment (SOER), which is an integrated assessment, analysing trends, progress to targets as well as outlook for the mid- to long-term. The agency publishes annually a report on Europe's most polluted provinces for air quality, detailing fine particulate matter PM 2.5.

The EEA shares this information, including the datasets used in its assessments, through its main website and a number of thematic information platforms such as Biodiversity Information System for Europe (BISE), Water Information System for Europe (WISE) and ClimateADAPT. The Climate-ADAPT knowledge platform presents information and data on expected climatic changes, the vulnerability of regions and sectors, adaptation case studies, and adaptation options, adaptation planning tools, and EU policy.

=== European Nature Information System ===
The European Nature Information System (EUNIS) provides access to the publicly available data in the EUNIS database for species, habitat types and protected sites across Europe. It is part of the European Biodiversity data centre (BDC), and is maintained by the EEA.

The database contains data

- on species, habitat types and designated sites from the framework of Natura 2000,
- from material compiled by the European Topic Centre on Biological Diversity
- mentioned in relevant international conventions and in the IUCN Red Lists,
- collected in the framework of the EEA's reporting activities.

== European environment information and observation network ==
The European Environment Information and Observation Network (Eionet) is a collaboration network between EEA member countries and non-member, cooperating nations. Cooperation is facilitated through different national environmental agencies, ministries, or offices. Eionet encourages the sharing of data and highlights specific topics for discussion and cooperation among participating countries.

Eionet currently includes covers seven European Topic Centres (ETCs):

- ETC on Biodiversity and Ecosystems (ETC BE)
- ETC on Climate Change Adaptation and LULUCF (ETC CA)
- ETC on Climate Change Mitigation (ETC CM)
- ETC on Data Integration and Digitalisation (ETC DI)
- ETC on Human Health and the Environment (ETC HE)
- ETC on Circular Economy and Resource Use (ETC CE)
- ETC on Sustainability Transitions (ETC ST)

The European Environment Agency (EEA) implements the "Shared Environmental Information System" principles and best practices via projects such as the "ENI SEIS II EAST PROJECT" & the "ENI SEIS II SOUTH PROJECT" to support environmental protection within the six eastern partnership countries (ENP) & to contribute to the reduction in marine pollution in the Mediterranean through the shared availability and access to relevant environmental information.

== Budget management and discharge ==
As for every EU body and institution, the EEA's budget is subject to a discharge process, consisting of external examination of its budget execution and financial management, to ensure sound financial management of its budget. Since its establishment, the EEA has been granted discharge for its budget without exception. The EEA provides full access to its administrative and budgetary documents in its public documents register.

The discharge process for the 2010 budget required additional clarifications. In February 2012, the European Parliament's Committee on Budgetary Control published a draft report, identifying areas of concern in the use of funds and its influence for the 2010 budget such as a 26% budget increase from 2009 to 2010 to €50 600 000. and questioned that maximum competition and value-for-money principles were honored in hiring, also possible fictitious employees.

The EEA's Executive Director refuted allegations of irregularities in a public hearing. On 27 March 2012 Members of the European Parliament (MEPs) voted on the report and commended the cooperation between the Agency and NGOs working in the environmental area. On 23 October 2012, the European Parliament voted and granted the discharge to the European Environment Agency for its 2010 budget.

== Executive directors ==
Name	Nationality	Term(s)
Domingo Jiménez-Beltrán	Spain	1994–2003
Jacqueline McGlade	United Kingdom	2003–2013
Hans Bruyninckx	Belgium	2013–2023
Leena Ylä-Mononen	Finland	2023–

== International cooperation ==
In addition to its 32 members and eight cooperating countries, the EEA also cooperates and fosters partnerships with its neighbours and other countries and regions, mostly in the context of the European Neighbourhood Policy:

- Eastern Partnership member states: Belarus, Armenia, Azerbaijan, Georgia
- Union for the Mediterranean member states: Algeria, Egypt, Israel, Jordan, Lebanon, Libya, Morocco, Palestinian Authority, Syria, Tunisia
- Other ENPI states: Russia
- Central Asian states: Kazakhstan, Kyrgyzstan, Tajikistan, Turkmenistan, Uzbekistan

Additionally the EEA cooperates with multiple international organizations and the corresponding agencies of the following countries:

- United States (Environmental Protection Agency)
- Canada (Environment Canada)

== Official languages ==
The 26 official languages used by the EEA are: Bulgarian, Czech, Croatian, Danish, German, Greek, English, Spanish, Estonian, Finnish, French, Hungarian, Icelandic, Italian, Lithuanian, Latvian, Maltese, Dutch, Norwegian, Polish, Portuguese, Romanian, Slovak, Slovene, Swedish and Turkish.

== See also ==
- Agencies of the European Union
- Citizen Science, public cleanup projects.
- EU environmental policy
- List of atmospheric dispersion models
- List of environmental organizations
- Confederation of European Environmental Engineering Societies
- Coordination of Information on the Environment
- European Agency for Safety and Health at Work
- Environment Agency
