= Daughters of Zelophehad =

Figures mentioned in the Biblical Book of Numbers

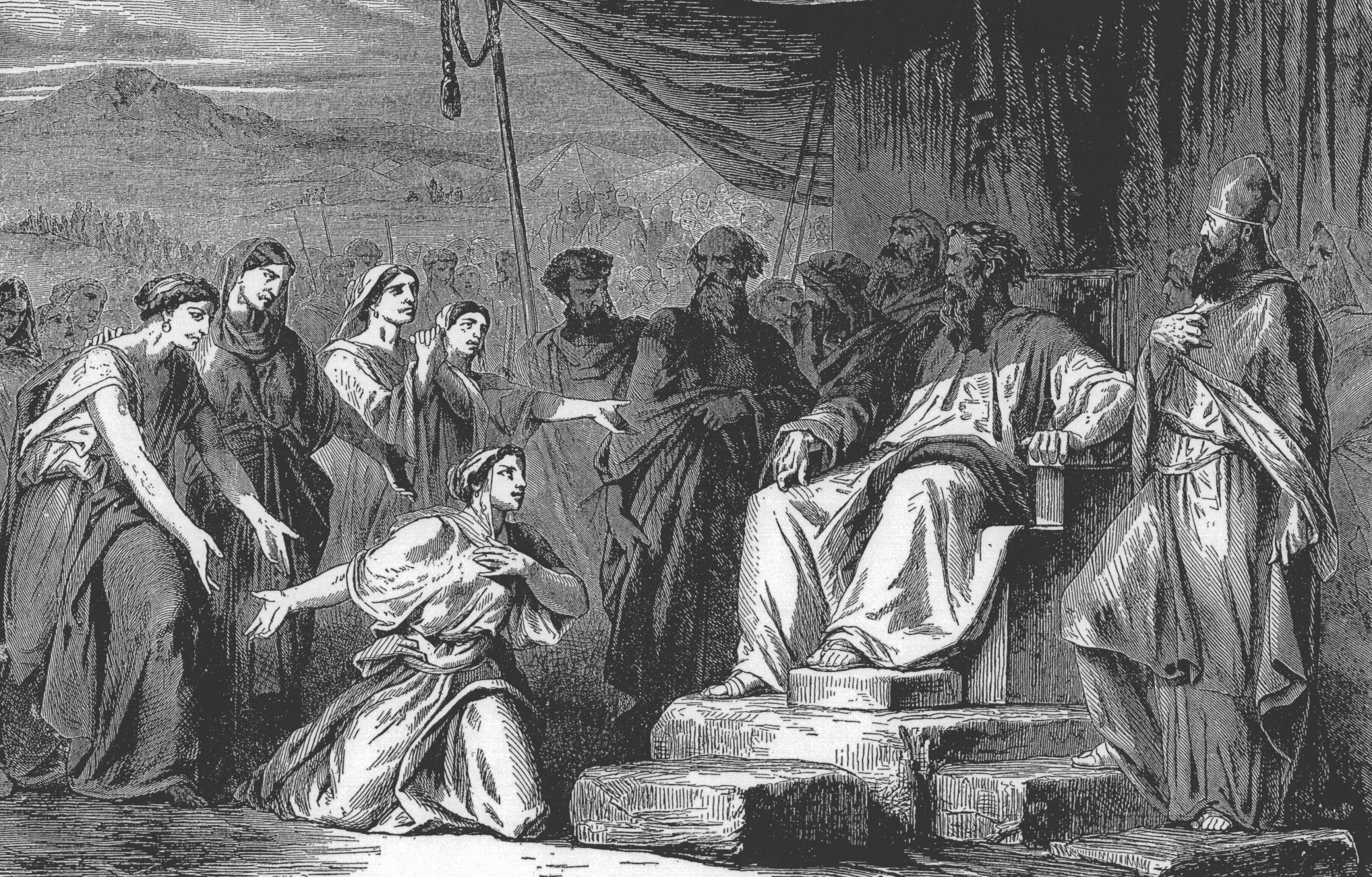
The Daughters of Zelophehad (illustration from the 1908 Bible and Its Story Taught by One Thousand Picture Lessons)

The Daughters of Zelophehad (Hebrew: בְּנוֹת צְלָפְחָד, romanized: Bənōṯ Ṣəlāfəḥāḏ) were five sisters – Mahlah (Hebrew: מַחְלָה Maḥlā), Noah (נֹעָה Nōʿā), Hoglah (חָגְלָה Ḥoglā), Milcah (מִלְכָּה Mīlkā), and Tirzah (תִרְצָה Tīrṣā) – mentioned in the biblical Book of Numbers. They lived during the Israelites' Exodus from Egypt as they prepared to enter the Promised Land and who raised before the Israelite community the legal case of a woman's right and obligation to inherit property in the absence of a male heir in the family. Zelophehad, a man of the Tribe of Manasseh, had five daughters but no sons, and therefore no male heirs.

== Biblical account ==
The biblical text tells little of Zelophehad himself, save that he died during the 40 years when the Israelites were wandering in the wilderness, and explicitly that he played no part in Korah's rebellion. Numbers 16 does not in any case cite the tribe of Manasseh as being involved in the rebellion against Moses.

Zelophehad's daughters petitioned Moses, Eleazar the priest, the tribal chiefs, and the whole assembly, at the entrance of the Tent of Meeting for their rights to inherit his property rights in the Land of Israel. Zelophehad's daughters noted that their father Zelophehad had not taken part in Korah's rebellion, but only died in his own sin. Zelophehad's daughters argued that were they not to inherit, then Zelophehad's name would be lost to his clan. Moses took their case to God. God told Moses that the plea of Zelophehad's daughters was just, and that they should be granted their father's hereditary holding.

Later, the family heads of the clan of Manasseh's grandson Gilead appealed to Moses and the chieftains, arguing that if Zelophehad's daughters married men from another Israelite tribe, then their share would be lost to the tribe of Manasseh and be added to the portion of the tribe into which they married. So Moses, at God's bidding, instructed the Israelites that the plea of the tribal leaders was just and that Zelophehad's daughters could marry anyone they wished, but only among the men of the tribe of Manasseh.

5 So Moses, at יהוה’s bidding, instructed the Israelites, saying: “The plea of the Josephite tribe is just. 6 This is what יהוה has commanded concerning the daughters of Zelophehad: They may become the wives of anyone they wish, provided they become wives within a clan of their father’s tribe. 7 No inheritance of the Israelites may pass over from one tribe to another, but the Israelite [heirs]—each of them—must remain bound to the ancestral portion of their tribe. 8 Every daughter among the Israelite tribes who inherits a share must become the wife of someone from a clan of her father’s tribe, in order that every Israelite [heir] may keep an ancestral share. 9 Thus no inheritance shall pass over from one tribe to another, but the Israelite tribes shall remain bound each to its portion.” 10 The daughters of Zelophehad did as יהוה had commanded Moses: 11 Mahlah, Tirzah, Hoglah, Milcah, and Noah, Zelophehad’s daughters, became the wives of their uncles’ sons, 12 becoming wives within clans of descendants of Manasseh son of Joseph; and so their share remained in the tribe of their father’s clan.

Zelophehad's daughters did as God had commanded in the instructions conveyed to Moses, and each married a son of an uncle, first cousin marriages. When the Israelites entered the land, Zelophehad's daughters appeared before Eleazer the priest, Joshua (who by then had assumed leadership from Moses), and the chieftains, reminding them that God had commanded Moses to grant them a portion among their kinsmen, and Zelophehad's daughters received a portion in the holdings of Manasseh, probably on the east side of the Jordan River.

== Rabbinical commentary ==
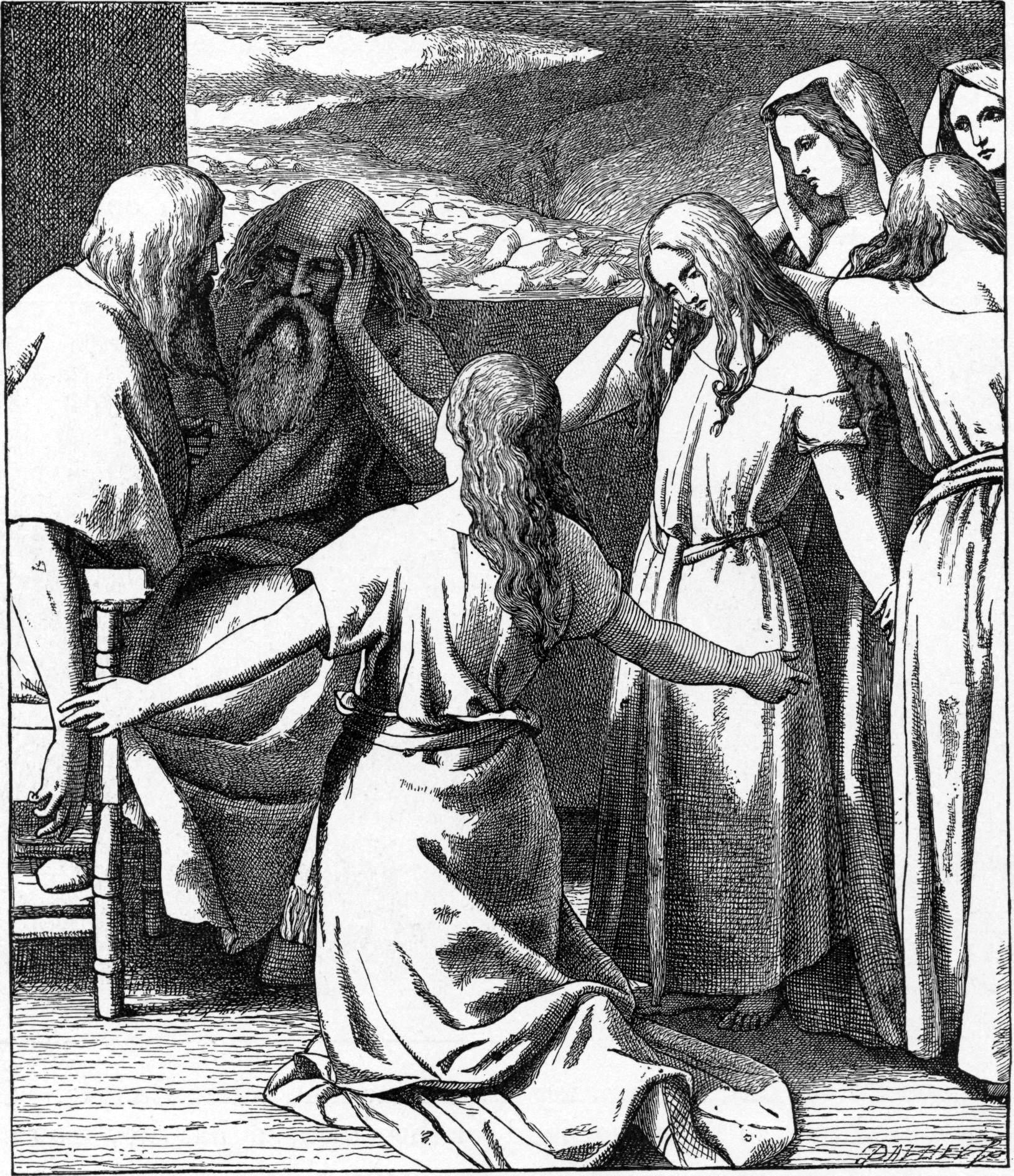
The Daughters of Zelophehad (illustration from the 1897 Bible Pictures and What They Teach Us by Charles Foster)

In the Talmud and the Zohar the reference to Zelophehad having "died in his own sin" is used to equate him with the man executed for gathering sticks on Shabbat, but Sifri Zutta says that it cannot be known if he was.

In the Talmud, Rabbi Josiah interpreted that they petitioned first the assembly, then the chieftains, then Eleazar, and finally Moses, but Abba Hanan said in the name of Eliezer ben Hurcanus of Judaea that Zelophehad's daughters stood before all of them as they were sitting together.

The Zohar said that Zelophehad's daughters drew near to Moses in the presence of Eleazar and all the chieftains because they were afraid of Moses' anger at Zelophehad and thought that it might be contained in a public forum. According to the Zohar, Moses presented the case to God instead of deciding it himself out of modesty.

A baraita taught that Zelophehad's daughters were wise, Torah students, and righteous. Another baraita taught that Zelophehad's daughters were equal in merit, and that is why the order of their names varies in the text. According to the Gemara, they demonstrated their wisdom by raising their case in a timely fashion, just as Moses was expounding the law of levirate marriage, or yibbum, and they argued for their inheritance by analogy to that law. The daughters also demonstrated their righteousness by marrying men who were fitting for them.

== Scholarly views ==
Two genealogies are given for Zelophehad by the Bible; in the Book of Chronicles, he is listed as a son of Manasseh. in other places where his genealogy is mentioned, he is listed as a son of Hepher, who was the son of Gilead, and therefore merely a descendant of Manasseh. Both of these genealogies record Zelophehad as being a member of the tribe of Manasseh. The apparent contradictions have been addressed by naming Zelophehad as a descendant rather than as the second [son].

According to Shammai Feldman, Zelophehad and his daughters are a fiction created simply to illustrate some of the legal rules of inheritance; Jewish textual scholars regard the accounts concerning Zelophehad's daughters as accretions added to the earlier priestly source narrative by writers from the same pro-Aaronid religio-political group. The presence of Zelophehad and his daughters in the earlier census is marked by the King James Version as having dubious authenticity.

According to Tevye's Daughters: No Laughing Matter, author Jan Lisa Huttner makes a connection from the five daughters of Zelophehad to Tevye's five daughters in Fiddler on the Roof. Sholem Aleichem presumably read the story of Zelophehad's five daughters and it is highly likely that Joseph Stein read it at one time too. The number five, five daughters—or to be exact, five dowries—is the same number God also bestowed on Sholem Aleichem.

=== Names ===
Linguistic scholars are divided in regard to the etymology of the name Zelophehad. Following the reading of the Masoretic Text, some scholars suspect that the name is derived from a Syriac term meaning "first rupture", in the sense of being a first-born son. Most scholars, following the Septuagint's rendering of the name as salpaad, believe that the name was derived from the Hebrew term salpahad, literally meaning "shadow from terror"; many of these scholars interpret this as referring to the shadow created by a shelter, and so interpret the name as "protection from terror", but others interpret it as meaning "the bringer of terror is shadowed".

In regard to the names of the daughters, scholars largely are in agreement; Mahlah means "forgiven", Noah means "movement", Milcah means "queen", Tirzah means "pleasing", Hoglah means "circling/dancing" (though for this reason it is also the word for partridge).

== Legal issues ==
Legal advice, concerning the inheritance rights and obligations of the daughters of Zelophehad, is given twice in the Biblical account. On the first occasion, the topic is about inheritance when there are no male children, while the topic of the second occasion is levirate marriage, and property inheritance remaining within a clan (not the tribe). The daughters are mentioned a third time, in the Book of Joshua, where they are simply portrayed as being given land in the territory of Manasseh, to which their inheritance entitled them; the text is unclear in regards to which part of Manasseh's territory they were granted land, except that it was not in Gilead.

=== Inheritance when there are no male children ===
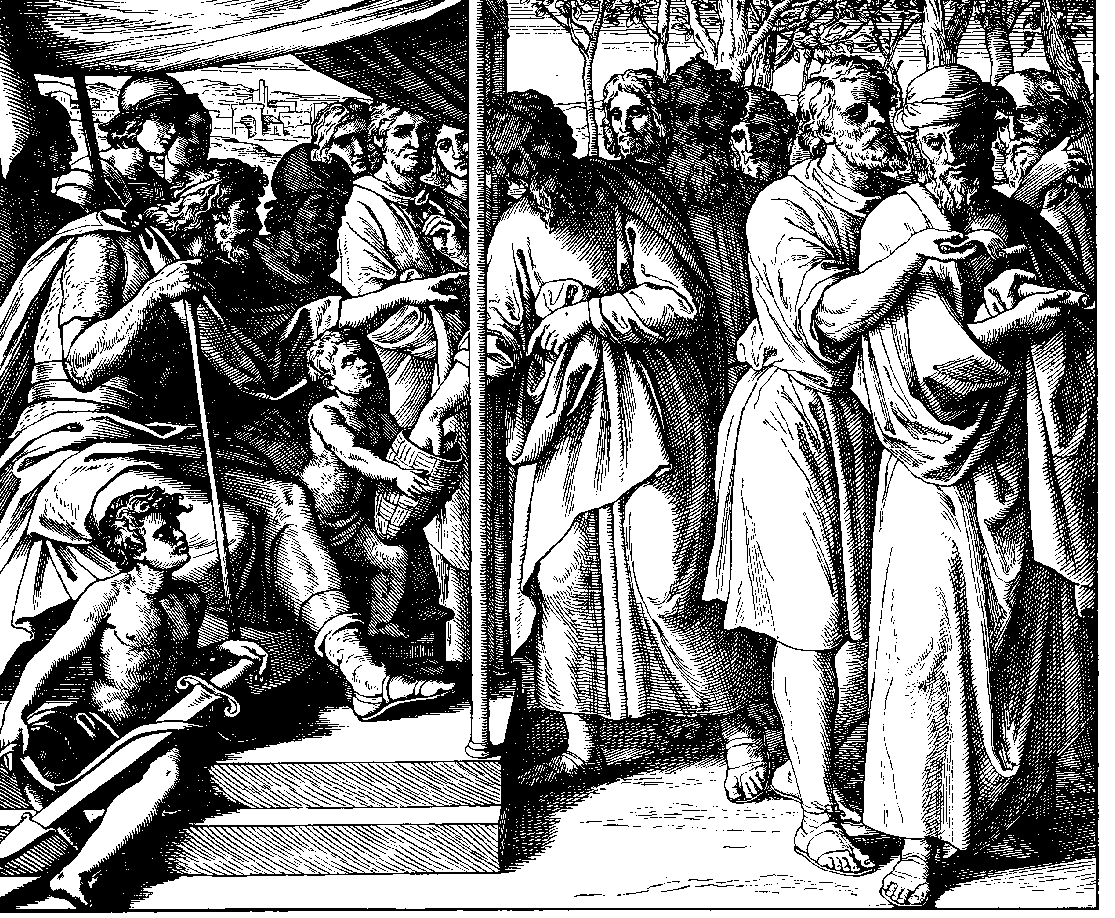
Casting lots for tribal inheritance, woodcut for Die Bibel in Bildern, 1860, Joshua, Chapter 14

In the Biblical account, earlier regulations had specified that property was to be inherited by heirs who were male, but the daughters were the only children of their now deceased father, and so they came to the door of the Tent of Meeting and asked Moses, Eleazer, the tribal chieftains, and the rest of the congregation, for advice on what was to be done, as there were no obvious male heirs; in the Talmud, opinions vary as to whether this means that the daughters petitioned all of these groups at the same time, with them gathered together, or if it means that the daughters first petitioned the congregation, then the chieftains, then Eleazar, and finally petitioned Moses.

The biblical text states that Moses asked Hashem to rule on the issue; the Zohar argues that Moses had presented the case to Hashem, rather than deciding it himself, because Moses was modest. The biblical account continues by stating that Moses was told by Hashem that the daughters should be considered their father's heirs, and that the general case holds - if there are no sons, the daughter (or daughters) should inherit - and if there are no children at all, the inheritance should pass to the man's brothers, and if there are no brothers it should pass to the nearest relative in his clan.

Maimonides, and other rabbinical commentators, extrapolated this into the conclusion that, if they exist, then sons and their descendants are the heirs of an individual, but if they do not it would be any daughters or their descendants, and if these do not exist then it would be the individual's father, and if he is no longer alive then the rule concerning heirs applies to him - the father's sons (the individual's brothers) and their descendants have priority, followed by the father's daughters (the individual's sisters), followed by the father's father (the individual's grandfather), and so on. However, although this was how the Pharisees saw the biblical implication, the Sadducees argued that if there were only female descendants of an individual's sons, and the sons themselves were dead, then the individual's daughters had the right to inherit.

Evidently the regulations preferring male descendants may have come to be disregarded in some respects, as the Book of Job, which textual scholars date to the fourth century BCE, states in its epilogue that Job's daughters were given equal inheritance rights to his sons, and the Karaites always gave daughters the same rights as sons. By the Middle Ages it came to be a tradition to evade the inequality between daughters and sons via a legal fiction, in which the father claims that he is indebted to his daughter for a certain sum of money, and that this debt is due by him and his heirs, and then makes a formal agreement that this debt is to be paid upon his death, either in cash or as a proportion of his estate equal to half the share of one of the sons; by this legal mechanism, the daughter would either gain a share in her father's estate, or a sum of money equal to its value.

=== Endogamous and exogamous inheritance ===
Later in the narrative of the Book of Numbers, the elders of the clan of Gilead petitioned Moses and the tribal chieftains for advice, because they were concerned that if Zelophehad's daughters married men from another Israelite tribe, the property that the daughters had inherited the right to would become the property of the other tribe, and would be lost from the tribe of Manasseh, to which Zelophehad had belonged. The narrative continues by stating that Hashem gave Moses a response to give to the elders, namely that the daughters must each marry someone from the Gilead clan, but they are otherwise unrestricted in their choice; the narrative also states that the general case was to be applied - that inheritances cannot pass between tribes, but instead any female that inherits land is compelled to marry someone from the same clan as her father. The narrative's coda mentions that the daughters each marry one of the sons of their uncles; the gemara states that the daughters had demonstrated their righteousness in doing so, as these men were fitting for them, and had not married earlier as they were waiting for suitable husbands.

The biblical prohibition of heiresses to commit exogamy was repealed by the classical rabbis; Rabbah argued that the rule only applied to the period that Canaan had been divided between the tribes, and had therefore become redundant, especially as the laws concerning the territory were in abeyance anyway, owing to the destruction of the Temple. Thus in all forms of Judaism following the Oral Law, women are allowed to marry whom they wish, including exogamously, whether they have gained an inheritance or not.

== See also ==
- Endogamy
- Exogamy
- Book of Numbers
- Oral law
- Weekly Torah portions discussing Zelophehad's daughters: Pinchas and Masei
- Numbers
- Tanakh
- Hebrew Bible
- Epikleros: comparable custom in Ancient Greek society
