= Balsam tree =

Balsam tree is the common name given to several genera or species of trees that are the source of resinous products, often known as balsam or balm.

(The Balsam tree is not to be mistaken for the Balsam plant, a common garden flowering plant which spreads it’s seeds by ‘explosion’)

Balsam tree may refer to:

- Abies balsamea, balsam fir, the source of Canada balsam
- Colophospermum mopane, an African leguminous tree with resinous seeds
- Commiphora gileadensis, the source of Balm of Mecca, presumed to be the biblical Balm of Gilead
- Daniellia oliveri, African copaiba balsam tree, a member of the genus Daniella
- Myroxylon, the source of both Balsam of Peru and Tolu balsam
- Populus sect. Tacamahaca, balsam poplars, the source of an ointment sold today as "Balm of Gilead"

== See also ==
- Balsam (disambiguation)
- Balm (disambiguation)
- Resin
