= Confederation of European Environmental Engineering Societies =

International organisation

Logo of the CEEES

The Confederation of European Environmental Engineering Societies (CEEES) was created as a co-operative international organization for information exchange regarding environmental engineering between the various European societies in this field.

The CEEES maintains an online public discussion forum for the interchange of information.

== The member societies of the CEEES ==
As of 2012, these were the twelve member societies of the CEEES:

- Italy: Associazione Italia Tecnici Prove Ambientali (AITPA)
- France: Association pour le Développement des Sciences et Techniques de l'Environnement (ASTE)
- Belgium: Belgian Society of Mechanical and Environmental Engineering (BSMEE)
- Germany: Gesellschaft für Umweltsimulation (GUS)
- Finland: Finnish Society of Environmental Engineering (KOTEL)
- Czech Republic: National Association of Czech Environmental Engineers (NACEI)
- Austria: Österreichische Gesellschaft für Umweltsimulation (ÖGUS)
- Netherlands: PLatform Omgevings Technologie (PLOT)
- United Kingdom: Society of Environmental Engineers (SEE)
- Sweden: Swedish Environmental Engineering Society (SEES)
- Portugal: Sociedade Portuguesa de Simulacao Ambiental e Aveliaca de Riscos (SOPSAR)
- Switzerland: Swiss Society for Environmental Engineering (SSEE)

Each member society successively holds the presidency and the secretariat for a period of two years.

== Technical Advisory Boards ==
The CEEES has three major Technical Advisory Boards:

- Mechanical Environments: The aim of this board is to advance methodologies and technologies for quantifying, describing and simulating mechanical environmental conditions experienced by mechanical equipment during its useful life.
- Climatic and Atmospheric Pollution Effects: The aim of this board is the study of the climatic and atmospheric pollution effects on materials and mechanical equipment.
- Reliability and Environmental Stress Screening: The aim of this board is the study how the environmental effects the reliability of equipment.

== Publications ==
These are some of the publications of the CEEES:

- A Bibliography on Transportation Environment, ISSN 1104-6341, published by the Swedish Packaging Research Institute (Packforsk) in 1994.
- Synthesis of an ESS-Survey at the European Level, ISSN 1104-6341, published by the Swiss Society for Environmental Engineering (SSEE) in 1998.
- List of Technical Documents Dedicated or Related to ESS, ISBN 91-974043-0-6, published by the Swiss Society for Environmental Engineering (SSEE) in 1998.
- Climatic and Air Pollution Effects on Material and Equipment, ISBN No. 978-3-9806167-2-0, published by Gesellschaft für Umweltsimulation (GUS) in 1999.
- Natural and Artificial Ageing of Polymers, 1st European Weathering Symposium, Prague. ISBN 3-9808382-5-0, published by Gesellschaft für Umweltsimulation (GUS) in 2004
- Natural and Artificial Ageing of Polymers, 2nd European Weathering Symposium, Gothenburg. ISBN 3-9808382-9-3, published by Gesellschaft für Umweltsimulation (GUS) in 2005
- Ultrafine Particles – Key in the Issue of Particulate Matter?, 18th European Federation of Clean Air (EFCA) International Symposium, published by the Karlsruhe Research Center (Forschungszentrum Karlsruhe FZK) in 2007.
- Natural and Artificial Ageing of Polymers, 3rd European Weathering Symposium, Kraków. ISBN No. 978-3-9810472-3-3, published by GUS in 2005.
- Reliability - For A Mature Product From The Beginning Of Useful Life. The Different Type Of Tests And Their Impact On Product Reliability. ISSN 1104-6341, published online by CEEES in 2009.

== See also ==
- European Environment Agency
- Environment Agency
- Ministry of Housing, Spatial Planning and the Environment (Netherlands)
- Environmental technology
- Environmental science
- Coordination of Information on the Environment
