= Oscar Haywood =

American politician

Oscar Haywood (January 6, 1868 – December 8, 1943) was an American Baptist preacher, orator, and politician from North Carolina. He was a pastor at Baptist churches in Tennessee, Connecticut, and New York City and then travelled widely giving speeches advocating for the Ku Klux Klan. He was also a book collector and had first editions and correspondence with various influential people in his collection at the Haywood Plantation house.

Not long after his return to North Carolina, he was elected to the North Carolina House of Representatives in 1927 as a Democrat. Despite being a supporter and advocate for the Ku Klux Klan he sponsored legislation in the North Carolina House of Representatives placing restrictions on secret groups. Haywood also sponsored legislation to prohibit "sexual immorality" but it failed after being debated.

== Biography ==
Haywood was born in Montgomery County, North Carolina to Harrietta Baldwin and William Haywood. He had a brother, J.B. Haywood, who lived in Savannah, Georgia. Haywood graduated from Wake Forest College. He received honorary degrees from several Baptist colleges and universities and was known as Dr. Oscar Haywood.

He supported racial segregation and the Ku Klux Klan, and advocated the view that the political leaders of the Northern states abused white Southerners during the Reconstruction Era that followed the American Civil War. In the wake of controversy over Thomas F. Dixon Jr.'s The Clansman: A Historical Romance of the Ku Klux Klan, he offered to debate Dixon. Howard was a Klokard of the Klan. In March 1923 he spoke at a Sayville church, advocating for the Klan.

Haywood was attacked by angry Catholics and Jews in Perth Amboy on June 4, 1923, after he was met by protesters outraged by his preaching at a Klan rally. He reportedly said that Jews and Catholics were "unworthy of American nationality." The confrontation made national headlines. He gave the Mt. Hermon Memorial Association annual address in 1929.

== Plantation house ==
His neoclassical plantation house is located on Thickety Creek Road in Mount Gilead. The Haywood Plantation House features a stained glass window with Haywood's initials O.H. incorporated into the design.

== Personal life and burial ==
Haywood married Marion Plesants. After becoming a widower, he married Mary Eaddy. He is buried in the Sharon Cemetery in Mount Gilead.

== See also ==
- Mount Gilead, North Carolina
