= Stephen Raudenbush =

Stephen W. Raudenbush
- Born: 1946 (age 79–80)
- Education: Harvard University
- Scientific career
- Fields: Sociology
- Workplaces: University of Chicago
- Doctoral advisors: Anthony Bryk; Sara Lawrence-Lightfoot

Stephen Webb Raudenbush (born c. 1946) is the Lewis-Sebring Professor of Sociology and Chairman of the Committee on Education at the University of Chicago. He is best known for his development and application of hierarchical linear models (HLM) in the field of education but he has also published on other subjects such as health and crime. Hierarchical linear models, which go by many other names, are used to study many natural processes. To use an example from education, a three level hierarchical model might account for the fact that students are nested in classrooms which are nested in schools. With the right data one could go further and note that schools are nested in districts which are nested in states. Repeated measures of the same individuals can be studied with these models as observations nested in people.

Raudenbush received an Ed.D. in Policy Analysis and Evaluation Research in 1984 from Harvard University. In subsequent years he made major contributions to education research. His work has earned him numerous honors. In 2004, he received the Palmer O. Johnson Memorial Award from American Educational Research Association. In 2006, he was awarded both the “Distinguished Contributions to Research in Education Award” and the “Robert Park Award,” for outstanding work in community and urban sociology. Raudenbush is also a member of the American Academy of Arts and Sciences and the National Academy of Sciences.

== Selected publications ==
- "How do we study what happens next?" Annals of the American Academy of Political and Social Science, November 1, 2005, 601(1).
- "Effects of Kindergarten Retention Policy on Children's Cognitive Growth in Reading and Mathematics." Educational Evaluation and Policy Analysis, 27,3,205-224, 2005. (With G. Hong).
- "Learning from attempts to improve schooling: The contribution of methodological diversity." Educational Researcher, Vol. 34(5), 25-31, 2005.
- "Social anatomy of racial and ethnic disparities in violence." American Journal of Public Health, 95: 224-232, 2005. (With R.J. Sampson and J.D. Morenoff).
- "What are value-added models estimating and what does this imply for statistical practice?" Journal of Educational and Behavioral Statistics, 29(1), 121-129, 2004.
- "Schooling, statistics, and poverty: Can we measure school improvement?" William H. Angoff Memorial Lecture Series, Educational Testing Service, Policy Evaluation and Research Center, 2004.
- "The social structure of seeing disorder." Social Psychology Quarterly, 67(4), 319-342, 2004. (With R.J. Sampson).
- "A multivariate, multilevel Rasch model for self-reported criminal behavior." Sociological Methodology, Vol. 33(1), 169-211, 2003. (With C. Johnson and R. J. Sampson).
- "Resources, instruction, and research." Educational Evaluation and Policy Analysis, 25(2), 1-24, 2003. (With D.K. Cohen and D.L. Ball).
- "Effects of Study Duration, Frequency of Observation, and Sample Size on Power in Studies of Group Differences in Polynomial Change." Psychological Methods, 6(4), 387.401, 2001. (With X. Liu).
- "Comparing personal trajectories and drawing causal inferences from longitudinal data." Annual Review of Psychology, 52, 501-25, 2001.
- Hierarchical Linear Models (Second Edition). Thousand Oaks: Sage Publications, 2002. (With A.S. Bryk).
