= Margaret Morgan Lawrence =

American psychiatrist

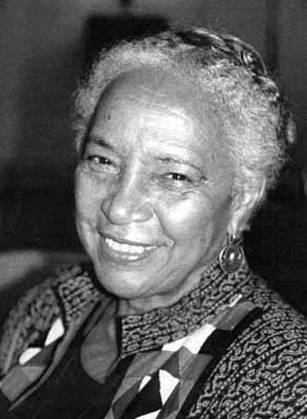
- Born: Margaret Cornelia Morgan; August 19, 1914; New York City, U.S.
- Died: December 4, 2019 (aged 105); Boston, Massachusetts, U.S.
- Education: Cornell University; Columbia University; New York State Psychiatric Institute
- Known for: Researching the presence and development of strength in young Black families; Author, The Mental Health Team in Schools (1971); Author, Young Inner City Families (1975); Subject of Balm in Gilead: Journey of a Healer (1988)
- Scientific career
- Fields: Child and adolescent psychiatry
- Workplaces: Columbia University; Harlem Hospital

Margaret Cornelia Morgan Lawrence (August 19, 1914 – December 4, 2019) was an American psychiatrist and psychoanalyst, gaining those qualifications in 1948. Her work included clinical care, teaching, and research, particularly into the presence and development of ego strength in inner-city families. Lawrence studied young children identified as "strong" by their teachers in Georgia and Mississippi, as well as on sabbatical in Africa in 1973, writing two books on mental health of children and inner-city families. Lawrence was chief of the Developmental Psychiatry Service for Infants and Children (and their families) at Harlem Hospital for 21 years, as well as associate clinical professor of psychiatry at Columbia University College of Physicians and Surgeons (P&S), retiring in 1984.

== Early life ==
Lawrence grew up an only living child of Mary Elizabeth (Smith) Morgan, a schoolteacher, and the Reverend Sandy Alonzo Morgan, an Episcopal minister. They lived in Richmond, Virginia but traveled to New York City for Lawrence's birth, as their first child had died in the local segregated hospital. Lawrence said, "In childhood and through adolescence I said I wanted to become a doctor because of the death of my only sibling, a brother, at eleven months, and two years before I was born. Someone like me could have saved him." After Lawrence's birth, the family returned to Virginia, then moved to heavily segregated Vicksburg, Mississippi.

== Education ==
Because she wanted to become a doctor, Lawrence moved to Harlem, New York City as a teenager in the 1920s to attend Wadleigh High School for Girls and live with family. Lawrence gained a scholarship from the National Council of the Episcopal Church and attended Cornell University from 1932 to 1936. She was the only African American undergraduate, denied a place in the segregated dormitory. Lawrence supported herself by working first as a maid to a white family, living in the attic, and later as a laboratory assistant.

Despite excellent academic performance, she was refused admittance to Cornell Medical School because she was black. Lawrence became the third African American admitted to Columbia College P&S, starting classes in the fall of 1936 and graduating in 1940. She was rejected from a residency at New York Babies Hospital because of her race, and rejected from Grasslands Hospital because she was married. Lawrence completed a two-year pediatric residency at Harlem Hospital (1940-1942).

With a Rosenwald Foundation fellowship, Lawrence then earned a master's degree in Science at Columbia University's Mailman School of Public Health. One of her teachers there was Dr. Benjamin Spock, who introduced her to the connections between physical, social, and psychological health. During World War II, Lawrence taught pediatrics and public health at Meharry Medical College in Nashville, Tennessee and decided to become a psychiatrist. In 1947 she began a National Research Council fellowship at the Babies Hospital, now an associate professor. In 1948 she became the first African American to join to the New York State Psychiatric Institute, as well as the first African American psychoanalysis trainee at Columbia University's Columbia Psychoanalytic Center, gaining certification as a pediatric psychiatrist in 1951.

== Career ==
Strength abounds in Harlem. Three hundred years of oppression and it survives. This is the task in Harlem, to see strength where it exists, to expect it to be there, right there, next to, and a part of nature, nurture and noxia. Even anger may show strength. It can sustain a child and protect him until he is helped to find more suitable vehicles for his ability to love and to act.

— Margaret Morgan Lawrence, 1975

Lawrence described her work with children and families in inner-city New York as integrating psychoanalytic wisdom with spirituality. When Swarthmore College awarded her an honorary doctorate in 2003, the citation said that through articles and books, Lawrence's work "markedly strengthened the social and ethical awareness of the field and inspired in it deeper appreciation for the resilience of spirit at the heart of every child."

Lawrence directed the Therapeutic Developmental Nursery at Harlem Hospital and was chief of the Developmental Psychiatry Service for Infants and Children (and their families) there for 21 years. Lawrence was also associate clinical professor of psychiatry back at Columbia's P&S, retiring in 1984. She studied children with difficulties and children identified as "strong" by their teachers, in Georgia and Mississippi, as well as on sabbatical in Africa in 1973. In the 1970s and 1980s Lawrence was one of the founders of the Rockland County Center for Mental Health and served on the New York State Planning Council for Mental Health. After retiring from her hospital and academic positions in 1984, she went into private practice.

== Major achievements and honors ==
Lawrence was co-founder of the Rockland County Center for Mental Health in New York, the first recipient of Rockland County, New York's J. R. Bernstein Mental Health Award. She was a founding board member of the Harlem Family Institute (HFI). The HFI presents the Margaret Morgan Lawrence Award to honor outstanding service to the children and families of Harlem.

She is the author of two books, The Mental Health Team in Schools (1971) and Young Inner City Families: Development of Ego Strength Under Stress (1975). The Susan Smith McKinney Steward Medical Society honored her with its Outstanding Women Practitioners in Medicine Award. In 2003 Swarthmore College awarded Lawrence the honorary degree of Doctor of Science at Swarthmore College, and she gave the Commencement Address. Lawrence also received the Episcopal Peace Fellowship's Sayre Prize in 2003, in recognition of her work to promote peace, justice, and non-violence. In 2004 she was awarded the Virginia Kneeland Frantz Distinguished Women in Medicine Award by the College of Physicians and Surgeons of Columbia University.

== Personal life ==
Born in New York City, Lawrence grew up in a series of Southern towns. In 1938, while at medical school, Lawrence married Charles Radford Lawrence II, then a "more militant" sociology student from Morehouse College, who continued as a sociologist and social activist, dying in 1986. They shared a deep commitment to religion and pacifism.

The Lawrences had three children, one of whom is sociologist Sara Lawrence-Lightfoot. Their other daughter, Paula Lawrence Wehmiller, has been an educator and Episcopal priest. Their son, Charles R. Lawrence III, is a professor of law.

One of the founders of a cooperative community called Skyview Acres in Rockland County, New York, Lawrence lived there from 1951. She was also active on peace councils. In 1998 she was the oldest in a group of people on the 85-mile march for peace from London to Canterbury. She also served as a lay reader in the Episcopal Diocese of New York.

Lawrence-Lightfoot wrote a dual autobiography and biography of her mother, Balm in Gilead: Journey of Healer (1988). Reviewed by H. Jack Geiger in The New York Times, the book chronicles "seven decades of struggle, change and achievement," including the accompanying emotional scars and conflicts. Geiger writes:

Do these scars last? I have rarely read anything as painful as Margaret Lawrence's account, told to her daughter, of her return to Columbia Presbyterian Hospital nearly 50 years later. She is, by now, a famous physician, full of honors and achievements. She steps into an elevator and then suddenly: "I feel especially self-conscious about my hands...I think, if only I had on my white coat, I could put them in my pockets...Here I am, black as you see me...Here are my hands, exposed...I am in the elevator, confronted with the difference."

In 2007 Lawrence-Lightfoot gave the annual Bertha May Bell Andrews Lecture at Bates College, telling the story of her mother's life, saying: "Her life has been one of courageous boundary crossing; enduring the visibility and distortions of tokenism, and the double oppressions and assaults of racism and sexism." She died on December 4, 2019, at the age of 105 in Boston.
