= Sara Lawrence-Lightfoot =

American sociologist

- Born: August 22, 1944 (age 82)
- Education: Swarthmore College; Bank Street College of Education; Harvard University
- Scientific career
- Fields: Sociology
- Workplaces: Harvard University
- Notable students: Eve Ewing; Adrienne Keene; Stephen Raudenbush; Sarah Dryden-Peterson

Sara Lawrence-Lightfoot (born August 22, 1944) is an American sociologist who examines the culture of schools, the patterns and structures of classroom life, socialization within families and communities, and the relationships between culture and learning styles. She is the Emily Hargroves Fisher professor at the Harvard Graduate School of Education and the recipient of a 1984 MacArthur Fellows Program award.

== Career ==
Lawrence-Lightfoot has pioneered portraiture, an approach to social science methodology that bridges the realms of aesthetics and empiricism, which she continues to use in her own work.

She has written 10 books, including I've Known Rivers, which explores the development of creativity and wisdom using the lens of "human archaeology," The Art and Science of Portraiture, which documents her pioneering approach to social science methodology, and The Third Chapter: Passion, Risk, and Adventure in the 25 Years After 50 (2009). Her most recent book, Exit: The Endings That Set Us Free, was a non-fiction nominee for the 2013 Hurston/Wright Legacy Award.

== Honors ==
In 1984, Lawrence-Lightfoot was awarded a MacArthur Fellowship, and thereafter became the first MacArthur grant recipient to serve as a member, and as chair, of the foundation's board. In 1993, received Harvard's George Ledlie Prize for research that makes the "most valuable contribution to science" and "the benefit of mankind." She received a Candace Award from the National Coalition of 100 Black Women in 1990.

In March 1998, she was the recipient of the Emily Hargroves Fisher endowed chair at Harvard University, which, upon her retirement, will become the Sara Lawrence-Lightfoot endowed chair, making her the first African-American woman in Harvard's history to have an endowed professorship named in her honor. She also has an endowed professorship named in her honor at Swarthmore College. In 2003, the Academy of Political and Social Sciences named her as its Margaret Mead Fellow.

Lawrence-Lightfoot was featured on the 2006 PBS television documentary African American Lives. In 2008, she was elected to membership in the American Philosophical Society.

== Works ==
=== Books ===
- Worlds Apart: Relationships Between Families and Schools (1978)
- Beyond Bias: Perspectives on Classrooms (1978)
- The Good High School: Portraits of Character and Courage (1983)
- Balm in Gilead: Journey of a Healer (1988), a personal memoir and biography of her mother, Margaret Morgan Lawrence
- Respect: An Exploration (1990)
- I've Known Rivers: Lives of Loss and Liberation (1995)
- The Art and Science of Portraiture (1997)
- The Essential Conversation: What Parents and Teachers Can Learn from Each Other (2003)
- The Third Chapter: Passion, Risk, and Adventure in the 25 Years After 50 (2009). ISBN 978-0-374-27549-5
- Exit: The Endings That Set Us Free (2012). ISBN 978-0-374-15119-5
- Growing Each Other Up: When Our Children Become Our Teachers (2016). ISBN 978-0-226-18840-9

=== Selected articles ===
- 1973. Politics and reasoning: Through the eyes of teachers and children. Harvard Educational Review, 43(2), 197–244.
- 1977. Family-school interactions: The cultural image of mothers and teachers. Signs: Journal of Women in Culture and Society, 3(2), 395–408.
- 1981. Toward conflict and resolution: Relationships between families and schools. Theory into Practice, 20(2), 97–104.
- 1986. On goodness in schools: Themes of empowerment. Peabody Journal of Education, 63(3), 9-28.
- 2005. Reflections on portraiture: A dialogue between art and science. Qualitative Inquiry, 11(1), 3–15.
- 2016. Commentary: Portraiture methodology: Blending art and science. LEARNing Landscapes, 9(2), 19–27.

== Personal life ==
Lawrence-Lightfoot comes from a family of educators. Both of her paternal grandparents were teachers in Mississippi. One of her maternal grandparents was a teacher as well, while the other was a priest. Lawrence-Lightfoot's mother, Dr. Margaret Morgan Lawrence, was the only African-American undergraduate student at Cornell, where she received a full scholarship to attend. Lawrence-Lightfoot's father, Charles Lawrence II, was a professor in the Department of Sociology at Brooklyn College. and a civil rights activist. Lawrence-Lightfoot is the middle child of three siblings. Her brother, Charles Lawrence III, is a law professor at the University of Hawai'i at Mānoa. Her sister is an Episcopal priest. Lawrence-Lightfoot has two children, a daughter and a son.

== Sources ==
- Official website
- Harvard Profile
