= Balm of Gilead (disambiguation) =

Balm of Gilead was a rare perfume mentioned in the Bible, which has come to signify a universal cure in figurative speech.

Balm of Gilead or similar may also refer to:

== Flora ==
- Cedronella, a genus of flowering plants
- Commiphora gileadensis, a shrub native to the Middle East
- Populus x jackii, the hybrid between balsam poplar and the eastern cottonwood
- Populus sect. Tacamahaca, a group of about 10 species of poplars
- Ginger beer plant, a form of fermentation starter
- Stacte, names used for one component of the Solomon's Temple incense

== Arts and entertainment ==
- Balm in Gilead, a 1965 play by Lanford Wilson
- Balm in Gilead (book), a 1988 biography of Margaret Morgan Lawrence
- "There Is a Balm in Gilead", a traditional African American spiritual song, including a list of recordings
- Balm in Gilead (album), by Rickie Lee Jones (2009)

== See also ==
- The Raven a poem by Edgar Allan Poe, with the line "Is there balm in Gilead?"
