= Gilead station =

- Gilead Railroad Station, Former
- U.S. National Register of Historic Places
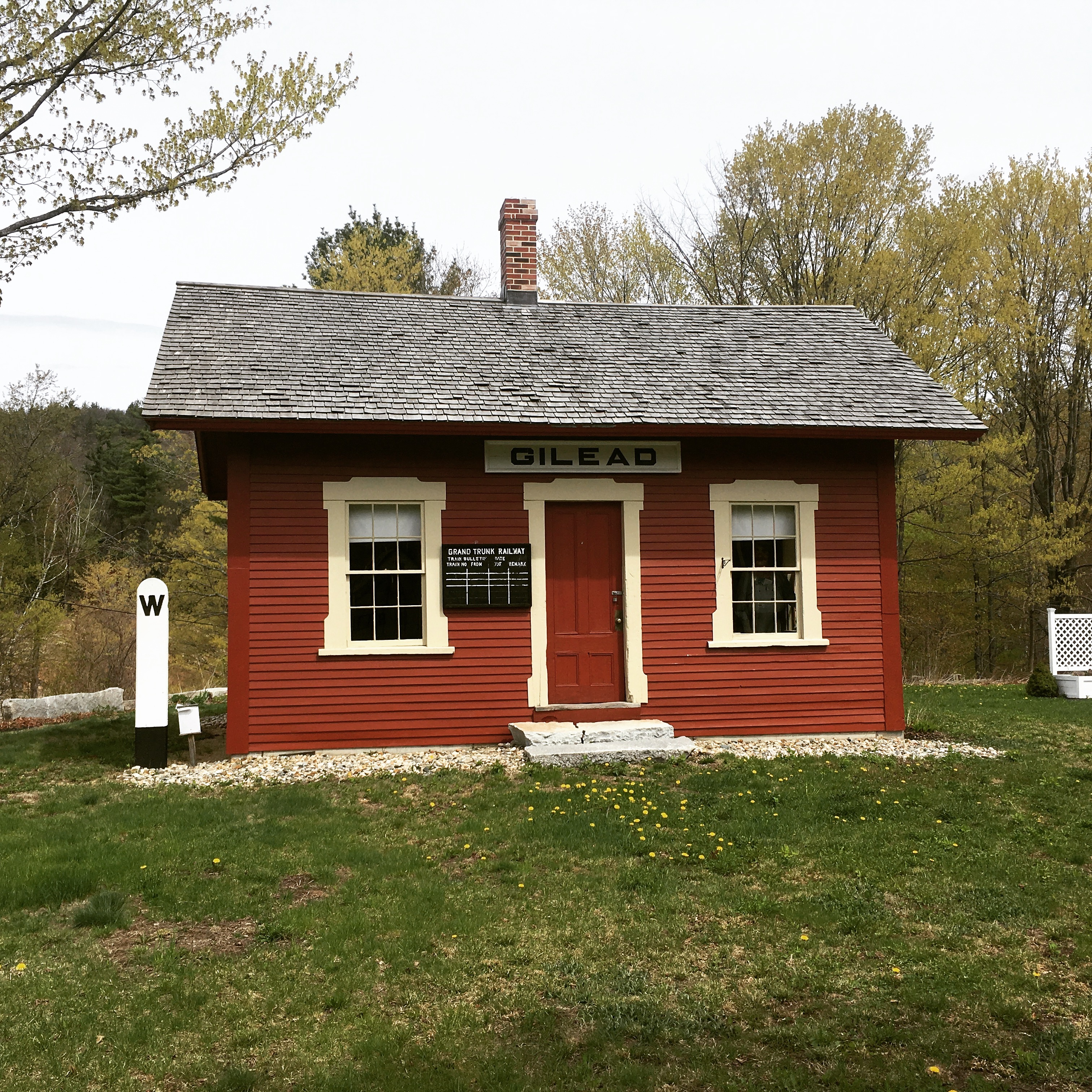
- Station pictured in 2017

- Location within Maine Location within the United States
- Nearest city: Depot Street and Bridge Street, just off US 2, Gilead, Maine
- Coordinates: 44°23′40″N 70°58′21″W
- Area: less than one acre
- Built: 1851
- NRHP reference No.: 100010457
- Added to NRHP: June 24, 2024

The Former Gilead Railroad Station is the oldest known railroad depot in the state of Maine, and the oldest known on the former Grand Trunk Railway. It is located in the center of Gilead, Maine, in northwestern Oxford County, not far from where it originally stood when built in 1851. It was listed on the National Register of Historic Places in 1992, when it was located in Auburn. It was delisted in 2024, and soon after relisted at its present location. It is now maintained by the Gilead Historical Society.

== Description and history ==
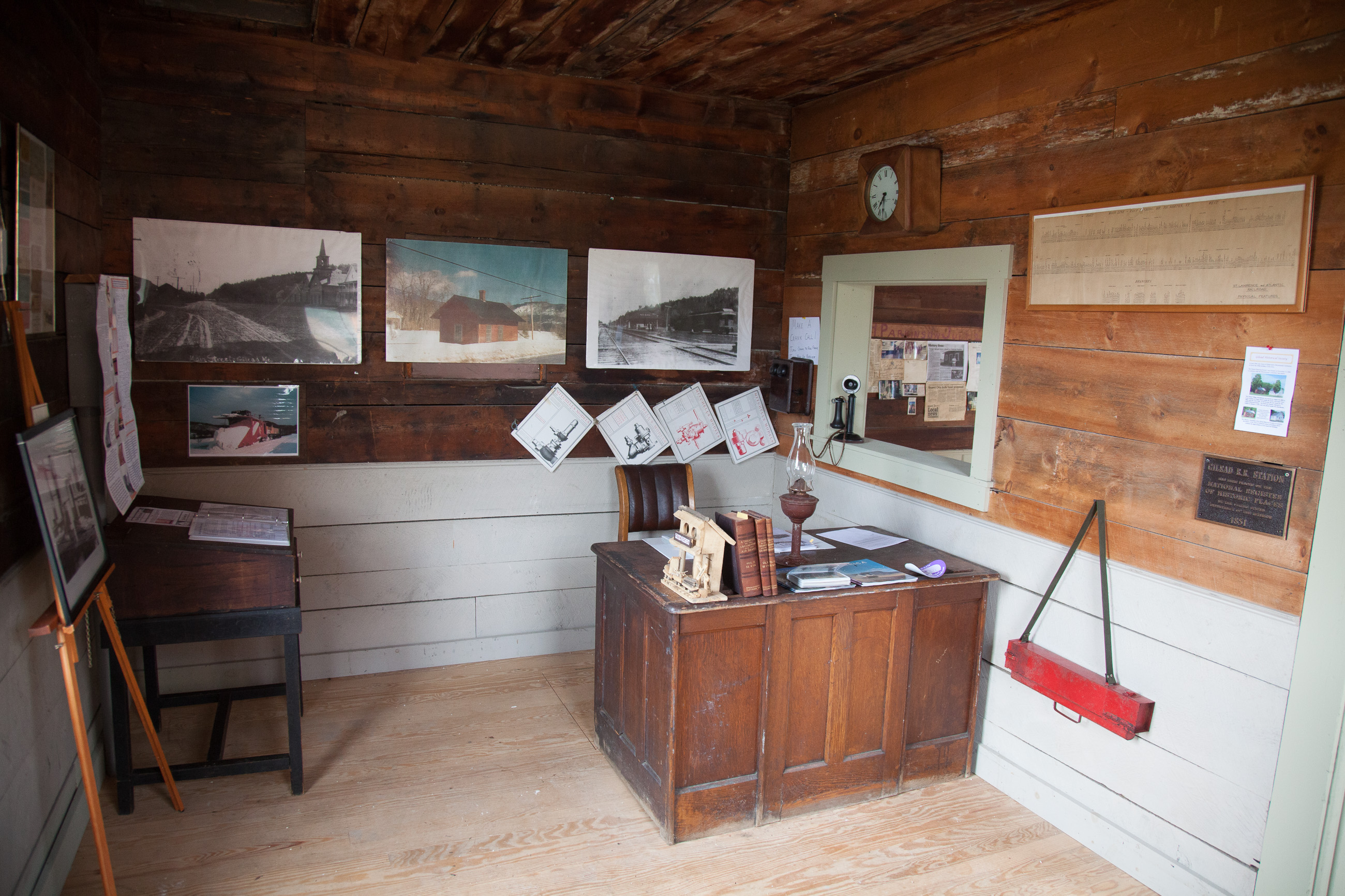
Restored interior of Gilead Railroad Station in 2013.

The Gilead Station is a single story wood frame structure of modest size. It is three bays wide and one deep, with a gable roof. The entrance is in the center of the three bays, and is flanked by sash windows. The surrounds of the door and windows are stylistically similar, with flared elements on the outer edges of the side molding, and an upward projection on the lintel. The interior of the station is divided into two rooms, the doorway entering into the larger one, which fills the center and right of the building. The room to the left originally house the stationmaster's office. It is unknown what the original interior looked like, as it has been extensively altered for a variety of uses prior to undergoing restoration.

The Grand Trunk Railway was founded in 1845 as a project to connect Portland, Maine and Montreal, Quebec by rail, providing a means to deliver supplies to Montreal via an ice-free port. Construction on the United States portion took place between 1846 and 1853, and the railway operated on the route until the 1920s. It is believed that this station was built in sections, which were transported to Gilead by the railroad for final assembly. Of the four surviving Grand Trunk stations, it is by far the oldest, and all of the stations of railroads chartered in Maine before the Grand Trunk have not survived.

The station has been moved several times. In 1893 it was moved a short distance from its original site, so that a larger station (which has not survived) could be built. The station was formally discontinued in the 1950s, and was used by track maintenance crews. In 1991 it was moved to Auburn, where it was restored and used as an office building. It was returned to Gilead in 2011, and is now maintained by the local historical society.

== See also ==
- National Register of Historic Places listings in Oxford County, Maine
