= Gilad =

Gilad or Ghil'ad (Hebrew: גלעד) is a masculine given name and a surname. It may refer to:

== Given name ==
- Gilad Atzmon (born 1963), Israeli-born British jazz saxophonist
- Gilad Bloom (born 1967), Israeli professional tennis player
- Gilad Bracha, American software engineer
- Gilad Erdan (born 1970), Israeli politician
- Gilad Hesseg (born 1971), Israeli folk rock singer-songwriter and composer
- Gilad Hochman (born 1982), Israeli classical music composer
- Gilad Janklowicz (born 1954), fitness guru
- Gilad Kariv (born 1973), Israeli attorney
- Gilad Karni, Israeli violist
- Gilad Shaer, 16-year-old killed in the 2014 kidnapping and murder of Israeli teenagers
- Gilad Shalit (born 1986), Israeli soldier
- Ghil'ad Zuckermann (born 1971), Israeli-born linguist and revivalist

== Surname ==
- Amos Gilad (1941–2010), Israeli Olympic runner
- Avri Gilad (born 1962), Israeli media personality
- Benjamin Gilad, pioneer in the field of competitive Intelligence
- Yehuda Gilad (musician), professor of clarinet at the Colburn School of music
- Yehuda Gilad (politician) (born 1955), former Israeli politician
- Zrubavel Gilad (1912–1988), Hebrew poet, editor and translator

== See also ==
- Gilead
