= Gilead, Maine =

Town in Maine, United States

- Town
- A view of Gilead in 1892

- Location within Maine Location within the United States
- Coordinates: 44°23′28″N 71°00′12″W
- Country: United States
- State: Maine
- County: Oxford

Area
  - Total: 19.67 sq mi (50.95 km^{2})
  - Land: 18.88 sq mi (48.90 km^{2})
  - Water: 0.79 sq mi (2.05 km^{2})
- Elevation: 666 ft (203 m)

Population (2020)
  - Total: 195
  - Density: 10/sq mi (4/km^{2})
- Time zone: UTC-5 (Eastern (EST))
  - Summer (DST): UTC-4 (EDT)
- ZIP code: 04217
- Area code: 207
- FIPS code: 23-27505
- GNIS feature ID: 582490

Gilead is a town in Oxford County, Maine, United States. Upon incorporation in 1804, it was named for the large quantity of Balm of Gilead trees in the town center. The population was 195 at the 2020 census.

== History ==
In the late 1700s, Massachusetts sold land in what is now Maine to encourage the settlement of the area. In 1772, Oliver and John Peabody, of Andover, Massachusetts, and John and Samuel Bodwell of Methuen, Massachusetts, bought 6000 acres above Sudbury Canada. Gilead was first granted as Peabody's Patent. In 1804, there were 20 families and the need for schools, churches, roads and other community necessities had become evident. It was time to raise money to bring this about. The petition was granted on June 23, 1804, and Peabody's Patent became Gilead.

== Geography ==
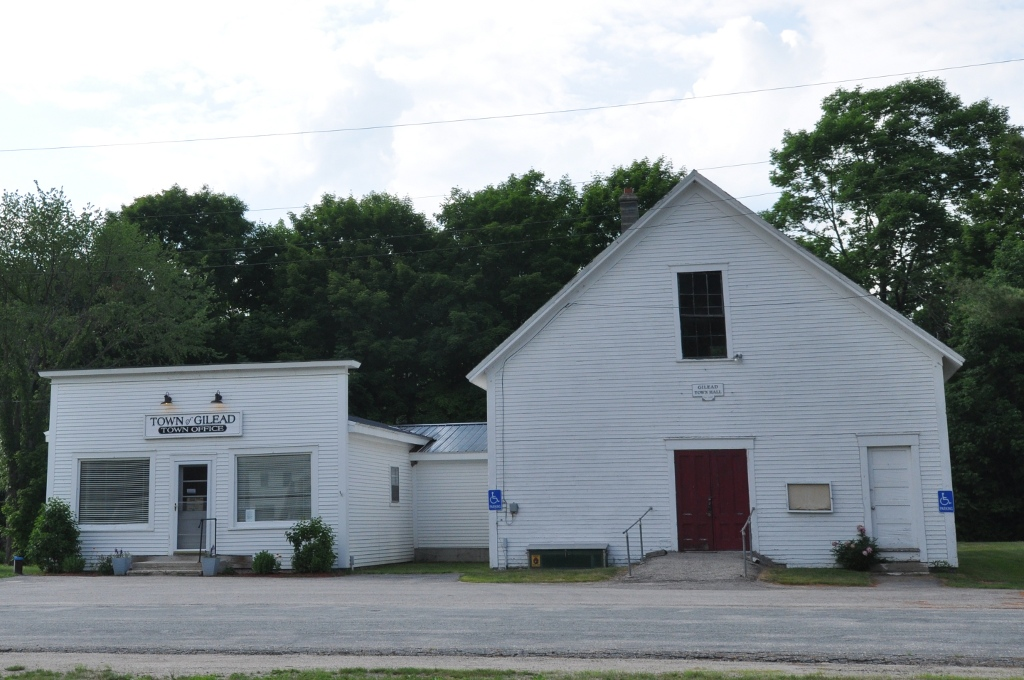
Town Hall

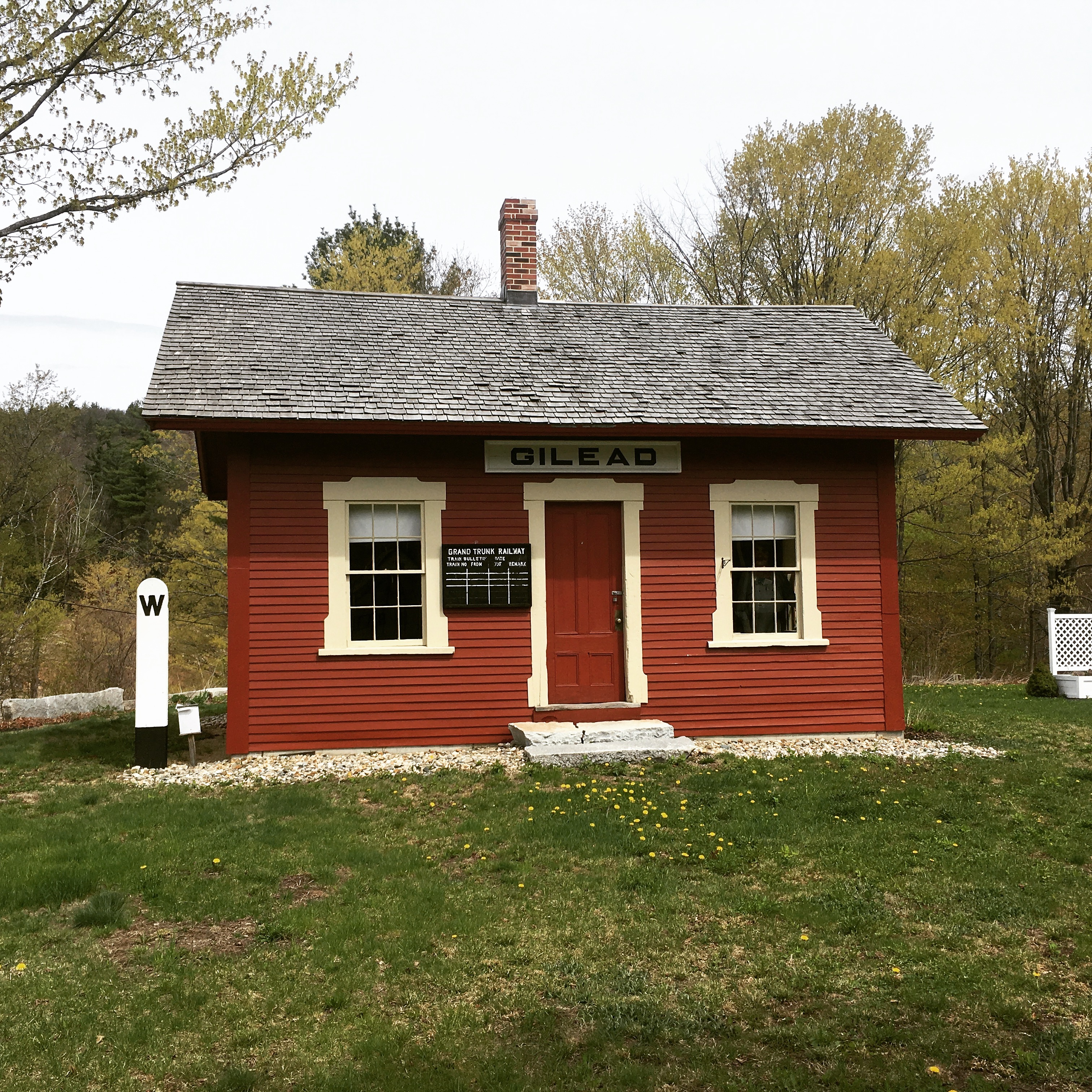
Gilead's 1851-built former Grand Trunk Railroad station. In 2001, it was returned to Gilead from Auburn, where it had been for 20 years.

According to the United States Census Bureau, the town has a total area of 19.67 square miles (50.95 km^{2}), of which 18.88 square miles (48.90 km^{2}) is land and 0.79 square miles (2.05 km^{2}) is water.

Gilead is the first town encountered when crossing into Maine from New Hampshire on U.S. Route 2, which is the major road in the town.

== Demographics ==
Historical population
Census	Pop.	Note	%±
1810	215		—
1820	328		52.6%
1830	377		14.9%
1840	313		−17.0%
1850	359		14.7%
1860	347		−3.3%
1870	329		−5.2%
1880	293		−10.9%
1890	336		14.7%
1900	340		1.2%
1910	233		−31.5%
1920	196		−15.9%
1930	220		12.2%
1940	160		−27.3%
1950	140		−12.5%
1960	136		−2.9%
1970	153		12.5%
1980	191		24.8%
1990	204		6.8%
2000	156		−23.5%
2010	209		34.0%
2020	195		−6.7%
U.S. Decennial Census

=== 2010 census ===
As of the census of 2010, there were 209 people, 98 households, and 59 families living in the town. The population density was 11.1 inhabitants per square mile (4.3/km^{2}). There were 151 housing units at an average density of 8.0 per square mile (3.1/km^{2}). The racial makeup of the town was 100.0% White. Hispanic or Latino of any race were 1.9% of the population.

There were 98 households, of which 19.4% had children under the age of 18 living with them, 54.1% were married couples living together, 2.0% had a female householder with no husband present, 4.1% had a male householder with no wife present, and 39.8% were non-families. 30.6% of all households were made up of individuals, and 17.4% had someone living alone who was 65 years of age or older. The average household size was 2.13 and the average family size was 2.64.

The median age in the town was 46.5 years. 16.7% of residents were under the age of 18; 5.3% were between the ages of 18 and 24; 26.8% were from 25 to 44; 29.2% were from 45 to 64; and 22% were 65 years of age or older. The gender makeup of the town was 55.5% male and 44.5% female.

=== 2000 census ===
As of the census of 2000, there were 156 people, 70 households, and 45 families living in the town. The population density was 8.2 inhabitants per square mile (3.2/km^{2}). There were 125 housing units at an average density of 6.6 per square mile (2.5/km^{2}). The racial makeup of the town was 98.72% White and 1.28% Native American.

There were 70 households, out of which 28.6% had children under the age of 18 living with them, 51.4% were married couples living together, 8.6% had a female householder with no husband present, and 34.3% were non-families. 25.7% of all households were made up of individuals, and 10.0% had someone living alone who was 65 years of age or older. The average household size was 2.23 and the average family size was 2.61.

In the town, the population was spread out, with 19.2% under the age of 18, 12.2% from 18 to 24, 26.9% from 25 to 44, 29.5% from 45 to 64, and 12.2% who were 65 years of age or older. The median age was 41 years. For every 100 females, there were 108.0 males. For every 100 females age 18 and over, there were 106.6 males.

The median income for a household in the town was $25,000, and the median income for a family was $34,250. Males had a median income of $17,188 versus $15,208 for females. The per capita income for the town was $13,489. About 9.4% of families and 11.4% of the population were below the poverty line, including 13.3% of those under the age of eighteen and 9.5% of those 65 or over.

== See also ==
- Louise Manny, historian and folklorist born in Gilead.
- Former Gilead Railroad Station
