= Balm, Alberta =

Coordinates: 53.9197222°N 115.2644444°W

Balm is a locality in Alberta, Canada.

Balm was so named for balsam trees near the original town site.
