= Mount Gilead Downtown Historic District =

Historic district in North Carolina, United States

- U.S. National Register of Historic Places
- U.S. Historic district
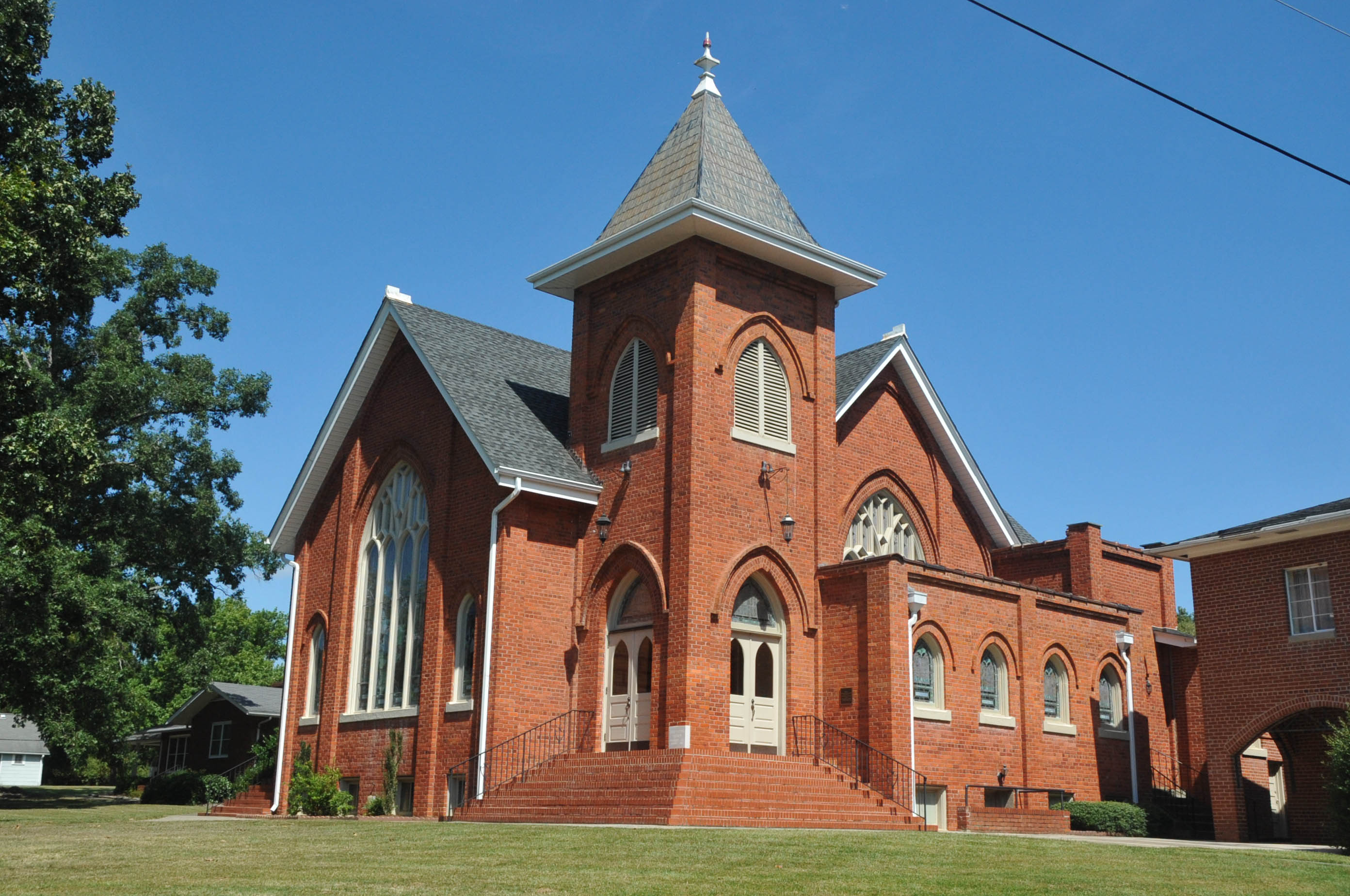
- First Baptist Church, March 2007

- Location within North Carolina Location within the United States
- Location: Main St. from First Ave. to 106 and 117 S. Main St., and the 100 blocks of West Allenton St., Mt. Gilead, North Carolina
- Coordinates: 35°12′54″N 80°00′07″W
- Area: 8 acres (3.2 ha)
- Built: 1900
- Architect: Haywood, W.T.; Holt, Dewitt
- Architectural style: Early Commercial, Romanesque
- NRHP reference No.: 05001447
- Added to NRHP: December 23, 2005

Mount Gilead Downtown Historic District is a national historic district located at Mount Gilead, Montgomery County, North Carolina. The district encompasses 25 contributing buildings in the central business district of Mount Gilead. It was developed between 1900 and 1955 and includes notable examples of Early Commercial and Romanesque Revival style architecture. Notable buildings include the Harris Building (1916), Mt. Gilead Town Hall and Annex (1939, 1955, 1960), Mt. Gilead Post Office (1910), First United Methodist Church (1910, 1960), First Baptist Church (1919), Randolph Knitting Company (1910), and Kennedy's Taxi Stand (1920s).

It was added to the National Register of Historic Places in 2005.
