= Jacqueline McGlade =

British-born Canadian marine biologist and environmental informatics professor

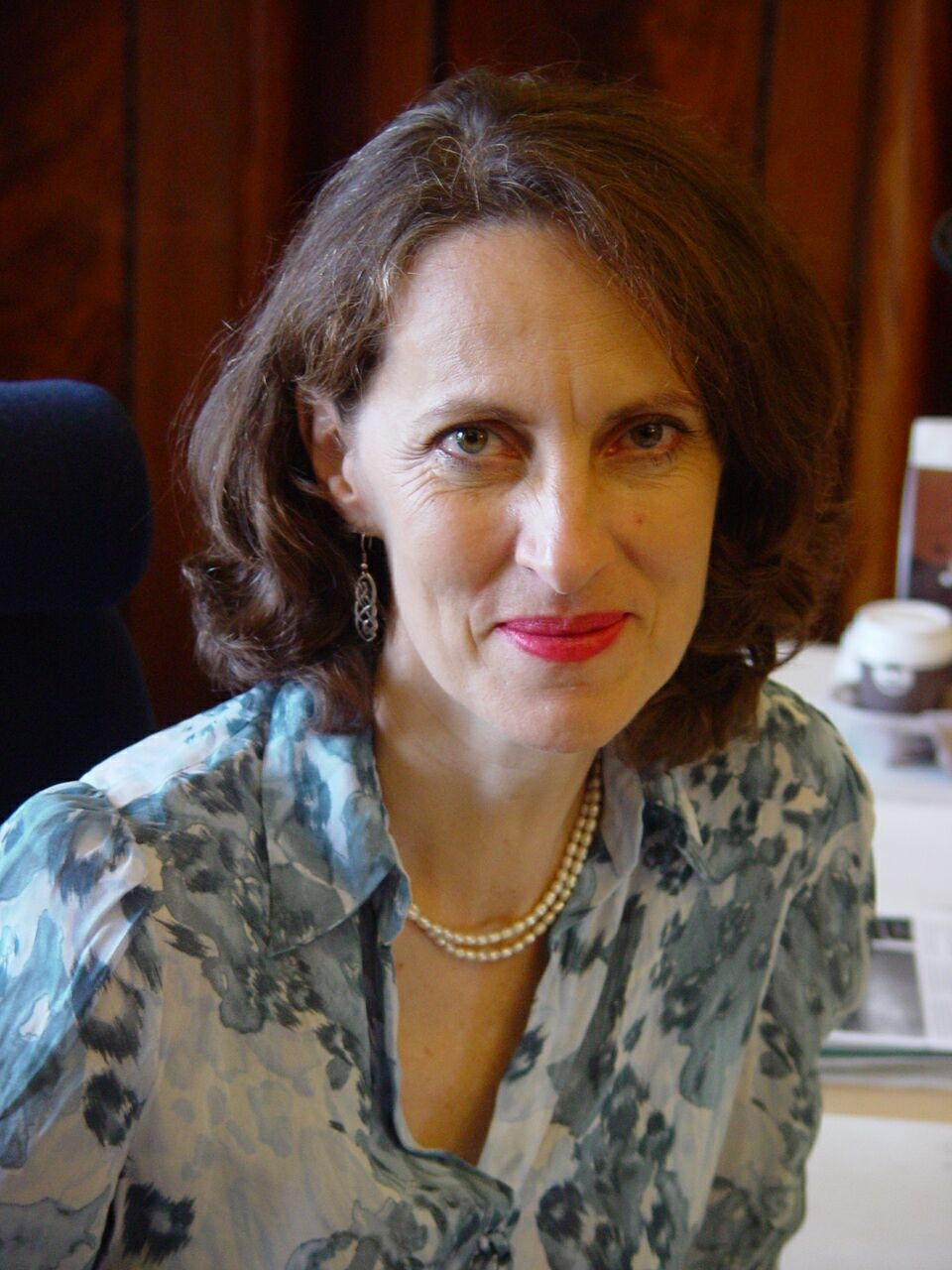
- Born: May 30, 1955 (age 71)
- Citizenship: Canadian/British/Masai(Kenya)
- Education: University of Cambridge, University of Guelph, University College of North Wales
- Awards: Global Citizen Award, Masaryk Gold Medal, Minerva Prize, Jubileum Award, Jessie Smith Noyes Foundation Award in Genetics
- Scientific career
- Fields: Science Policy, Environmental informatics, Marine science, Theoretical ecology, Ichthyology
- Workplaces: UNEP, European Environment Agency, University College London, University of Warwick, UCL Institute for Global Prosperity
- Thesis: Genotypic and phenotypic variation in the brook trout, Salvelinus fontinalis (Mitchell) (1980)

Notes
- Married to a Masai chief

Jacqueline Myriam McGlade (born May 30, 1955) is a British-born Canadian marine biologist and environmental informatics professor. Her research concerns the spatial and nonlinear dynamics of ecosystems, climate change and scenario development. She is currently professor of resilience and sustainable development at the University College London Institute for Global Prosperity and Faculty of Engineering, UK, and professor at Strathmore University in the Institute for Public Policy and Governance, Kenya.

She was executive director of the European Environment Agency from 2003 to 2013, where she was on leave from her post as professor of environmental informatics at University College London.

Between 2014 and 2017 she was chief scientist and director of the Science Division of the United Nations Environment Programme based in Nairobi. From 2017 to 2019 she was professor and director of the Sekenani Research Centre of the Maasai Mara University, Kenya.

== Education ==
Professor McGlade completed her BSc in Marine Biology, Biochemistry and Soil Science at Bangor University (then known as the University College of North Wales), UK, in 1977. She obtained her PhD degree in 1980 on aquatic sciences and zoology from the University of Guelph in Canada. In 1987, she obtained a MA degree from the University of Cambridge in the UK.

=== Honorary titles ===
- 2013 honorary fellow, Institution of Environmental Sciences
- 2004 honorary doctorate, University of Kent, U.K.
- 2003 honorary fellow, University of Wales, U.K.
- 1998 honorary professor, University of Warwick, U.K.

== Research and science policy ==
=== Theoretical ecology, spatial dynamics, ecosystems and science-policy ===
McGlade’s PhD research on the mathematical and statistical analysis of the phenotypic and genotypic variability showed the critical importance of spatial dynamics in determining evolutionary divergence and ecological sustainability in freshwater and marine fish populations. This work led to her establishing the first population dynamics and genetics laboratory and developing spatial Lotka-Volterra models, ecological networks and artificial intelligence to apply earth observations in biological oceanography, fisheries and fleet deployment in Fisheries and Oceans Canada at the Bedford Institute of Oceanography, with NOAA (National Oceanic and Atmospheric Administration in the USA) and the intelligence systems laboratory at Xerox PARC.

From 1987-1990, Professor McGlade continued her research in systematics, ichthyology, population dynamics and coastal issues in Cambridge as the Adrian Fellow at Darwin College, at the International Federation of Institutes of Advanced Study in the Netherlands, and Cranfield Institute in the UK.

In 1988 Professor McGlade was appointed as a Director at KFA (now FZ) Jülich in Germany and led research on theoretical ecology. In 1992 she became Professor in Biological Sciences at the University of Warwick and from 2000 was NERC Professorial Fellow at University College London. She and her research teams developed knowledge about spatial dynamical systems (differential equations, coupled-map lattices, cellular automata and individual based models) to study the behaviour of a wide range of ecosystems. The ideas and theories developed led to significant insights into the role of evolutionarily stable attractors, invasion exponents and phenotype dynamics in a wide range of ecosystems, including the African savannah, marine communities, annual and perennial plants and forests and red grouse.

From 1998-2000, she was Director of NERC's Center for Coastal and Marine Science. She also served as a Board Member of the Environment Agency England and Wales and as a member of the Advisory Council for the Campaign for Science and Engineering. In 2013 she was appointed as Chief Scientist of UNEP where she has researched the science policy interface, integrated global environmental assessment, near-real time environmental monitoring systems and the use of geospatial and big data in statistics for sustainable development.

== European Environment Agency ==
Professor McGlade was appointed as executive director to the European Environment Agency from 2003 to 2013. At the EEA, she introduced SEIS, the Shared Environmental Information System for national reporting and indicator development and brought together key aspects of national and international research outputs, including those from the Copernicus earth observation programme. Under her leadership, the Agency reinforced its capability to produce integrated environmental assessments, analyse the state of Europe’s environment as a whole, and provide reliable projections. Professor McGlade worked to strengthen the link between science and policy. She pointed at the magnitude of climate change and urged policymakers to start developing and applying adaptation measures.

McGlade was a firm advocate of informing and involving the public in all aspects of the environment. To this end, she strove to strengthen the information and feedback channels between researchers, public and policymakers, making environmental information understandable and accessible through technological media.

== United Nations Environment Programme ==
In 2013, McGlade joined UNEP at its headquarters in Nairobi and in 2014 became chief scientist and director of the Division of Early Warning and Assessment. After joining she continued the development of UNEP Live, an open cross-lingual platform for global exchange of environmental information, and led UNEP's assessment and statistical activities including the environmental dimension of the Sustainable Development Goals, Global Environmental Outlook, Emission Gap Report and Frontiers: Emerging issues of global importance.

== Academic prizes and scholarships ==
- Global Citizen Award, Global Spatial Data Infrastructure Association, 2013
- Masaryk Gold Medal, University of Brno (Czech Republic), 2005
- Minerva Prize (Germany), 1992
- Member of Honour, International Institute for Dynamical Systems (Romania), 1991
- Jubileum Award, Chalmers Technical University (Sweden), 1991
- Jessie Smith Noyes Foundation Award in Genetics (USA), 1980
- Best Research Paper, American Fisheries Society (USA), 1979
- Commonwealth Scholarship (Canada), 1977–80
- Rotary International Graduate Scholarship (Indonesia), 1977

== Research interests ==
- Metrics of sustainability, resilience and prosperity
- Analysis of risk and uncertainty in complex systems
- Development & implementation of enviroinformatics, including definition of metadata structures, semantic nets and data analysis
- Fuzzy-logic expert systems for environmental management and environmental forecasting
- Ecological economics
- Evolutionary ecology, with special reference to systematics of fishes and marine organisms
- Application of earth observation data to ecosystem analysis and management
- Modelling the spatio-temporal dynamics of terrestrial and aquatic systems
- Artificial ecologies
- Integrated natural resource management
