= Mount Gilead, North Carolina =

- Town
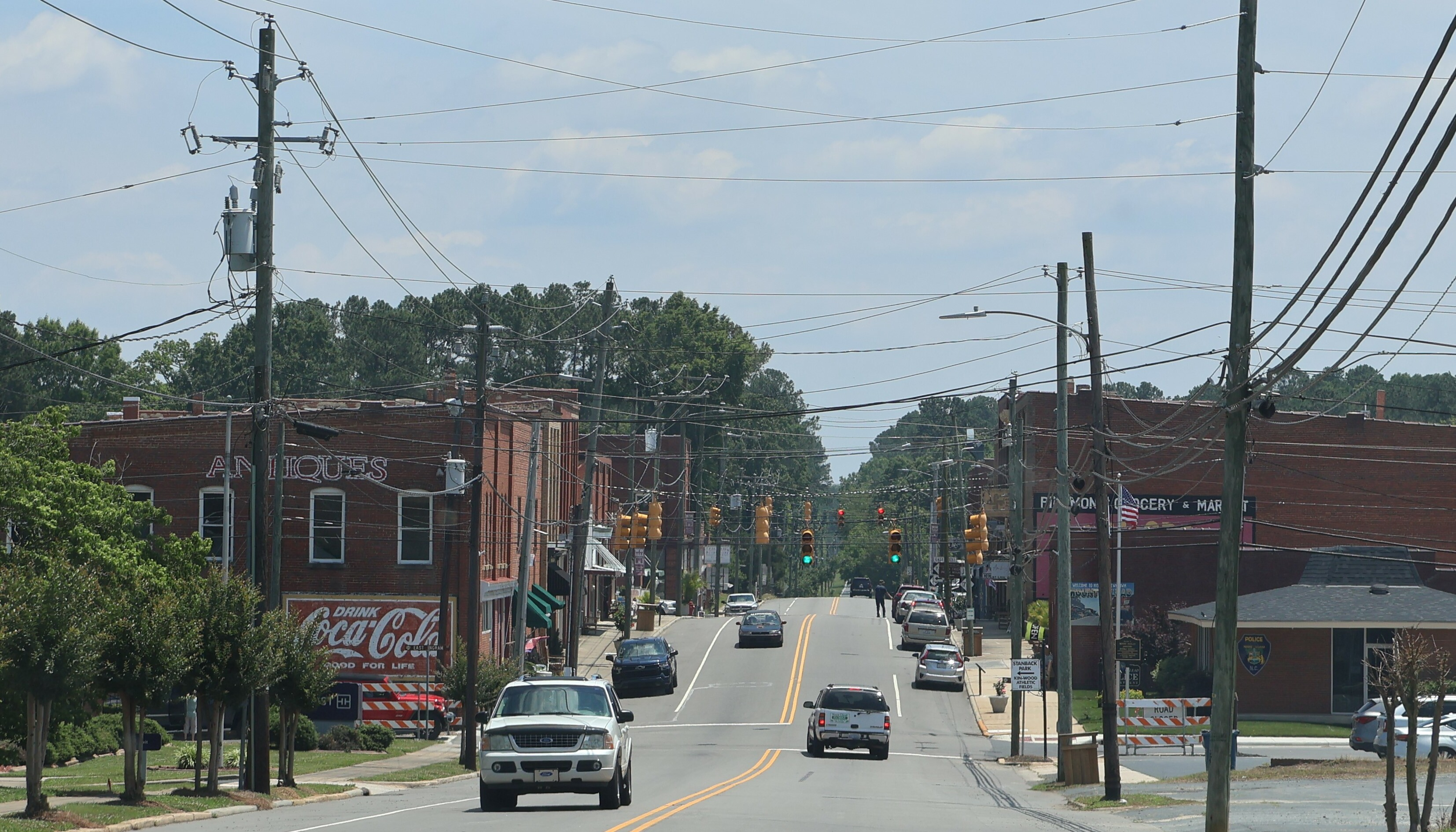
- Downtown Mount Gilead

- Seal
- Motto: "Small Town. Big Ideas. Lots to do."
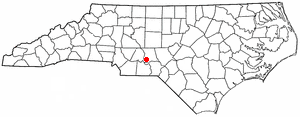
- Location in North Carolina
- Coordinates: 35°12′59″N 80°00′18″W
- Country: United States
- State: North Carolina
- County: Montgomery

Government
  - Mayor: Sheldon Poplin Morley
  - Town Manager: Dylan Haman

Area
  - Total: 3.49 sq mi (9.04 km^{2})
  - Land: 3.49 sq mi (9.04 km^{2})
  - Water: 0 sq mi (0.00 km^{2})
- Elevation: 410 ft (120 m)

Population (2020)
  - Total: 1,171
  - Density: 335.6/sq mi (129.56/km^{2})
- Time zone: UTC-5 (Eastern (EST))
  - Summer (DST): UTC-4 (EDT)
- ZIP Code: 27306
- Area codes: 910, 472
- FIPS code: 37-44900
- GNIS feature ID: 2406206
- Website: www.mtgileadnc.com

Mount Gilead is a town in Montgomery County, in the Piedmont region of North Carolina, United States. The population was 1,171 at the 2020 census.

== History ==
=== Ancient history ===
The region was occupied by the Pedee people, part of the South Appalachian Mississippian culture, from about 980 to 1150 CE.They built the earthwork platform mound and other structures at Town Creek Indian Mound, which was designated a National Historic Landmark in 1966 and is 5 miles (8 km) southeast of Mount Gilead. It is the only Native American site in the state to be designated as a national landmark. In the 21st century, the Pee Dee people are based in South Carolina, where the state has recognized several bands as tribes.

=== European-American settlement ===
Mount Gilead was incorporated in 1899 as the textile industry built mills in the Piedmont region of the state above the Atlantic Seaboard Fall Line. They processed the commodity crop of cotton, which had been important to the South since before the Civil War. The textile mills provided jobs to white residents of the region, later also employing blacks and supporting relative prosperity in the region.

Since the late 20th century, many textile jobs moved offshore in a restructuring of the industry as it sought lower labor costs. Like many small southern towns, Mount Gilead suffered economic and population decline following the loss of these textile jobs.

=== Historic district ===
The town has begun to emphasize the appeal of its historic resources. The Mount Gilead Downtown Historic District has been inventoried and was listed on the National Register of Historic Places in 2005. Mount Gilead was selected to participate in the N.C. Small Town Main Street Program (co-sponsored by the National Trust for Historic Preservation) and received a S.T.E.P. (Small Town Economic Prosperity) grant of $220,000 to help revitalize the downtown area and create jobs, respectively.

== Geography ==
Mount Gilead is in southwestern Montgomery County. North Carolina Highway 73 passes through the center of town as Main Street, leading northwest 16 miles (26 km) to Albemarle and southeast 18 miles (29 km) to Ellerbe. Highway 109 passes through the town northwest of its center, leading northeast 12 miles (19 km) to Troy, the Montgomery county seat, and south-southwest 19 miles (31 km) to Wadesboro. Highway 731 passes through the center of town as Allenton Street, leading east 18 miles (29 km) to Candor and west 7 miles (11 km) to Norwood.

According to the U.S. Census Bureau, the town has a total area of 3.3 square miles (8.5 km^{2}), all land. The town sits on a ridge that drains northwest toward Clarks Creek, a tributary of the Pee Dee River, and southeast toward Hamer Creek, a tributary of the Little River, also part of the Pee Dee watershed.

== Demographics ==
Historical population
Census	Pop.	Note	%±
1900	395		—
1910	723		83.0%
1920	975		34.9%
1930	1,011		3.7%
1940	915		−9.5%
1950	1,201		31.3%
1960	1,229		2.3%
1970	1,286		4.6%
1980	1,423		10.7%
1990	1,336		−6.1%
2000	1,389		4.0%
2010	1,181		−15.0%
2020	1,171		−0.8%
U.S. Decennial Census

=== 2020 census ===
Mount Gilead racial composition
Race	Number	Percentage
White (non-Hispanic)	570	48.68%
Black or African American (non-Hispanic)	506	43.21%
Native American	13	1.11%
Asian	25	2.13%
Other/Mixed	40	3.42%
Hispanic or Latino	17	1.45%

As of the 2020 United States census, there were 1,171 people, 476 households, and 273 families residing in the town.

=== 2000 census ===
As of the census of 2000, there were 1,389 people, 502 households, and 367 families residing in the town. The population density was 424.2 inhabitants per square mile (163.8/km^{2}). There were 553 housing units at an average density of 168.9 per square mile (65.2/km^{2}). The racial makeup of the town was 50.04% African American, 46.29% White, 0.50% Native American, 2.16% Asian, 0.29% from other races, and 0.72% from two or more races. Hispanic or Latino of any race were 0.58% of the population.

There were 502 households, out of which 31.9% had children under the age of 18 living with them, 49.8% were married couples living together, 20.9% had a female householder with no husband present, and 26.7% were non-families. 25.1% of all households were made up of individuals, and 13.9% had someone living alone who was 65 years of age or older. The average household size was 2.64 and the average family size was 3.14.

In the town, the population was spread out, with 26.6% under the age of 18, 7.1% from 18 to 24, 25.3% from 25 to 44, 22.2% from 45 to 64, and 18.9% who were 65 years of age or older. The median age was 38 years. For every 100 females, there were 80.9 males. For every 100 females age 18 and over, there were 74.4 males.

The median income for a household in the town was $31,250, and the median income for a family was $36,250. Males had a median income of $29,375 versus $21,750 for females. The per capita income for the town was $16,236. About 15.6% of families and 18.3% of the population were below the poverty line, including 25.5% of those under age 18 and 14.8% of those age 65 or over.

== Notable people from Mount Gilead ==
- Julius L. Chambers, civil rights attorney, was born in Mount Gilead in 1936. A graduate of the University of North Carolina at Chapel Hill (J.D., 1962), Chambers served as editor-in-chief of the school's Law Review. He next earned a master of law degree from New York's Columbia University in 1964.
- Oscar Haywood (1868–1943) was a Baptist preacher and segregationist politician. The Haywood plantation house where he lived is in Mount Gilead, and he is buried in Sharon Cemetery in the town.

== Sites of interest ==
The Mount Gilead Museum is located in a restored Victorian house near the downtown area. The house belonged to the McAulay family, who played an important role in Mount Gilead business, church, social, and civic life. The museum houses many documents, photographs, and historic artifacts that tell the story of Mount Gilead's past.

Downtown Mount Gilead is also a host for a moon tree at the Mount Gilead Community Garden. The Moon Tree was planted on June 3, 2024, by Mary Poplin and her daughter as part of a special community ceremony. This historic tree, a loblolly pine, is one of a select few grown from seeds that orbited the moon aboard NASA's Artemis I mission in 2022.

== Arts ==
The Piedmont Center of the Arts and Ford Place Restaurant, Pub & Special Events Center were developed with funding from the North Carolina Rural Center. The arts facility houses a wood-turner who gives lessons, the office of the Mount Gilead Arts Guild, a retail co-op store, and a clock repair shop. The restaurant is based in an adapted Ford dealership. Customers see much of the town's history preserved on the walls and under glass on the tables.

Mount Gilead has a number of visual and performing artists who routinely show their work at the arts complex.

The Mount Gilead Community Concerts Association (MGCCA) is a non-profit organization presenting a program of diverse performing arts to the local area. Incorporated in 2001, the organization presents an annual Concert Series featuring visiting musicians. When possible, these artists present a program for local school students. MGCCA is governed by a volunteer board of directors and supported through the contributions of local individuals and companies.

The Mount Gilead Community Choir has produced annual concerts since its founding in 1995. This group of volunteer singers traditionally presents a Christmas concert on the first Sunday in December. The choir is supported in part by the Mount Gilead Community Concerts Association (MGCCA), and more information can be found of the organization's website.

Community Radio WMTG-LP (88.1 FM) is a non-commercial, low-power station that serves the town by airing announcements of local interest. The station programs a mix of oldies and adult contemporary music and broadcasts 24 hours a day. WMTG is a service of the Mount Gilead Community Concerts Association (MGCCA).
