= Balm in Gilead (book) =

Book by Sara Lawrence-Lightfoot

Balm in Gilead: Journey of a Healer
- First edition
- Author: Sara Lawrence-Lightfoot
- Language: English
- Series: Radcliffe Biography Series
- Genre: Biography
- Publisher: Addison-Wesley, Spine Lean edition
- Publication date: 1988
- Publication place: United States
- Pages: 321
- ISBN: 978-0201093124
- OCLC: 462905172
- Website: www.saralawrencelightfoot.com/balm-in-gilead.html

Balm in Gilead: Journey of a Healer is Sara Lawrence-Lightfoot's 1988 biography of her mother, Dr. Margaret Morgan Lawrence, who was one of the first black women to graduate from Cornell University and Columbia University Medical School.

== Background ==
Lawrence-Lightfoot developed the project in collaboration with her mother, through a series of taped conversations. She published the book with Addison-Wesley in October 1988, as part of the Radcliffe Biography Series.

== Content ==
The book examines four generations of Lawrence-Lightfoot's family, following her mother's childhood (primarily in Vicksburg, Mississippi), her move to Harlem to finish high school while living with her grandmother, her college education at Cornell University then medical school at Columbia University, then her eventual career as a pediatrician, then psychiatrist and professor of psychiatry. Writing for the Los Angeles Times, Phyllis Crockett described Balm in Gilead as "the story of how Dr. Margaret Morgan Lawrence became who she is: a successful retired child psychiatrist, widow of the equally successful sociologist Dr. Charles Lawrence, and mother of three children who are successful in their careers. The book probes how she achieved that success despite the psychological scars of racism and sexism."

== Reception ==
Reviewing Balm in Gilead for The Washington Post, Nell Irvin Painter praised the book for its "sensitivity and candor", comparing it to John Hope Franklin's biography of George Washington Williams. Contrasting these with earlier African American works constrained by an obligation to present a favorable image to white audiences, Painter suggested Balm in Gilead belonged to a new group of biographies of African Americans "none of which prettifies subjects or censors foibles." H. Jack Geiger writing for The New York Times said, "We are indebted to [Lawrence-Lightfoot] (and her mother and father) for their candid portrait of this black Southern middle-class version of a journey - so different from that of Richard Wright's Black Boy or the passage of Malcolm X - that is a central theme in black American fiction and biography," traveling "across the rugged terrain of race and gender in America."
