= EPA Network =

The EPA Network is the European Network of the Heads of Environment Protection Agencies.

The EPA Network is an informal grouping of the Heads and Directors of European Environmental Protection Agencies and similar bodies across Europe. The Network is a forum for the exchange of views and experiences on issues of common interest to organisations involved in the practical day-to-day implementation of environmental policy. The EPA Network was established in 2003 and consists at present of 39 organisations. The Network meets twice a year in plenary and has established a number of interest groups dealing with issues of interest to member agencies. The issues dealt with by the interest groups cover topics from better regulation to climate change adaptation. The Network has issued a number of statements on environmental policy and implementation.

- The Oslo Statement: Improving the Effectiveness of EU Environmental Regulation - A Future Vision
- The Helsinki statement on Barriers to Better Regulation
- Zagreb Statement on Revision of the Construction Product Directive
- The Dessau statement on Sustainable Use of Natural Resources
- The Prague statement on Better regulation

The secretariat is at present hosted by the European Environment Agency which is also a member of the EPA Network and is located in Copenhagen

The EPA Network cooperates on common issues with the network of European Nature Protection Agencies ENCA, as well as with other networks, such as, IMPEL

== Background ==
Few realize that some 70–80% of environmental legislation in the member states of the European Union and member states of the European Economic Area is actually decided and agreed at EU level., The laws developed and adopted at EU level either apply directly or are transposed into national legislation after decision by national parliaments. . This should, though, not come as a surprise. Air and water pollution, acid precipitation, climate change and many other environmental problems tend to ignore national borders. Typically, they present a threat that can affect more than one country. If we want to tackle these problems successfully, it makes more sense to address them at regional, and even in some cases global, level.

It is usually the task of Environmental Protection Agencies within individual countries, with around five exceptions where the ministries have the role, to oversee and implement these obligations and enforce national laws. However, as the legal and institutional structures differ remarkably across Europe, so too do the approaches to implementation of environmental legislation. Consequently there is a substantial variety in the roles of EPAs and what they are tasked with, however the main tasks are:

- Information and data handling, including research, monitoring, as well as information systems and assessment
- Operational tasks, including: advice to ministries and citizens, enforcement of regulations and licensing

The EPA Network provides a forum for the heads of these agencies to exchange vies and share experiences at a strategic level.
