= Gilead (tribal group) =

Gilead was a tribal group mentioned in Biblical passages which textual scholars attribute to early sources. In these sources, for example the Song of Deborah, the Gilead group is treated with equal status to the other Israelite tribes, while certain other tribes, including the Tribe of Manasseh, are absent. An eponymous Gilead is mentioned in the biblical genealogies as a descendant of Manasseh, presumably implying that the Gilead group was part of Manasseh, and since Gilead is also the name of a specific part of the land east of the Jordan River, the Gilead tribal group presumably refers to the half tribe of Manasseh which resided on this side of the Jordan. The identity as part of a single tribe named Manasseh, doesn't appear to have been fully accurate in practice, since there was very little geographic connection between the two half tribes, only just touching at a corner of each, and according to the Book of Chronicles each half tribe historically had always had separate tribal rulers.

How much of the half tribe the Gilead group constituted is unclear, since a tribal group named Machir is given equal status to Gilead in the early biblical passages, as a separate group rather than as a group containing the Gilead group within it, and an eponymous Machir, also descended from Manasseh, is mentioned as having conquered and also settled on the eastern side of the Jordan. The biblical genealogy of Manasseh, which textual scholars regard as dating from centuries after the passages mentioning Gilead and Machir as tribal groups, identify Machir as the immediate father of Gilead, raising the question of how this could be consistent with the earlier passages treating the Machir group as distinct from the Gilead group.
