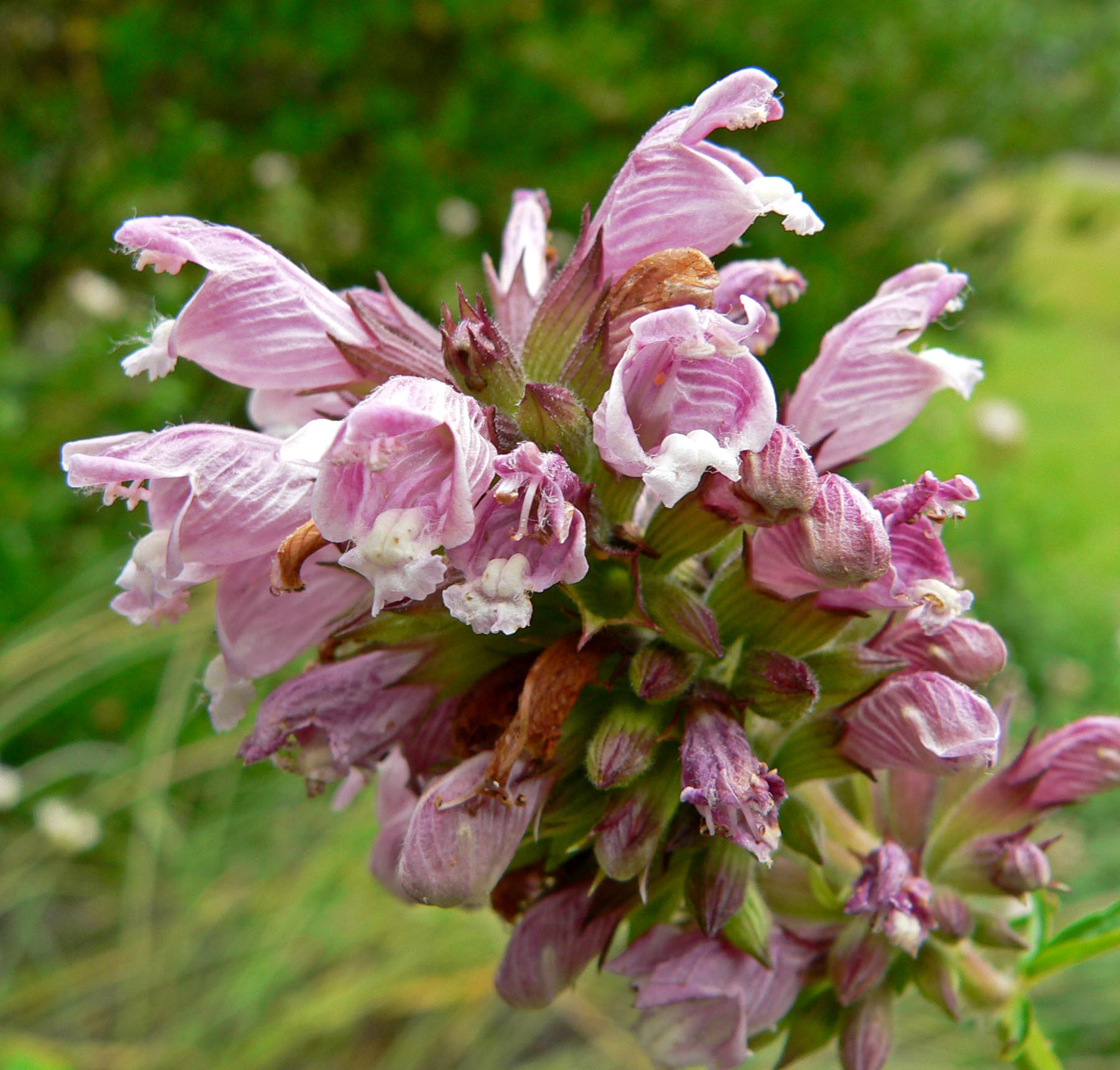

Scientific classification
- Kingdom: Plantae
- Clade: Embryophytes
- Clade: Tracheophytes
- Clade: Angiosperms
- Clade: Eudicots
- Clade: Asterids
- Order: Lamiales
- Family: Lamiaceae
- Subfamily: Nepetoideae
- Tribe: Mentheae
- Genus: Cedronella; Moench
- Species: C. canariensis

Binomial name
- Cedronella canariensis (L.) Webb & Berthel.

Synonyms
- Brittonastrum triphyllum (Moench) Lyons; Cedronella madrensis M.E.Jones; Cedronella triphylla Moench; Dracocephalum balsamicum Salisb. nom. illeg.; Dracocephalum canariense L.; Dracocephalum ternatifolium Stokes

= Cedronella =

Genus of flowering plants

Cedronella is a genus of flowering plants in the tribe Mentheae of the family Lamiaceae, comprising a single species, Cedronella canariensis, native to the Canary Islands, the Azores, and Madeira. It is also naturalized in various places (South Africa, St. Helena, New Zealand, California). Common names include Canary Islands-balm, Canary balm, and Balm-of-Gilead.

It is a perennial herbaceous plant growing to 1–1.5 m tall. The distinctive feature of these plants is the compound leaves consisting of 3 leaflets, unusual in the Lamiaceae, which usually have simple leaves. The leafy stems terminate in dense, short spikes of flowers with tubular 2-lipped white or pink flowers.

The genus name is a diminutive of Cedrus, though the only connection between this herb and the large conifers of Cedrus is a vaguely similar resinous scent of the foliage.

== Cultivation ==
Grown outdoors in mild climates, these perennials need protection in a sunny position in the herb garden and moist, well-drained soil. In cool climates they can be grown in a sunny conservatory. Water freely in the growing season. Propagate from seed or from cuttings.
