= The Fall of a Nation =

1916 film by Thomas Dixon, Jr.

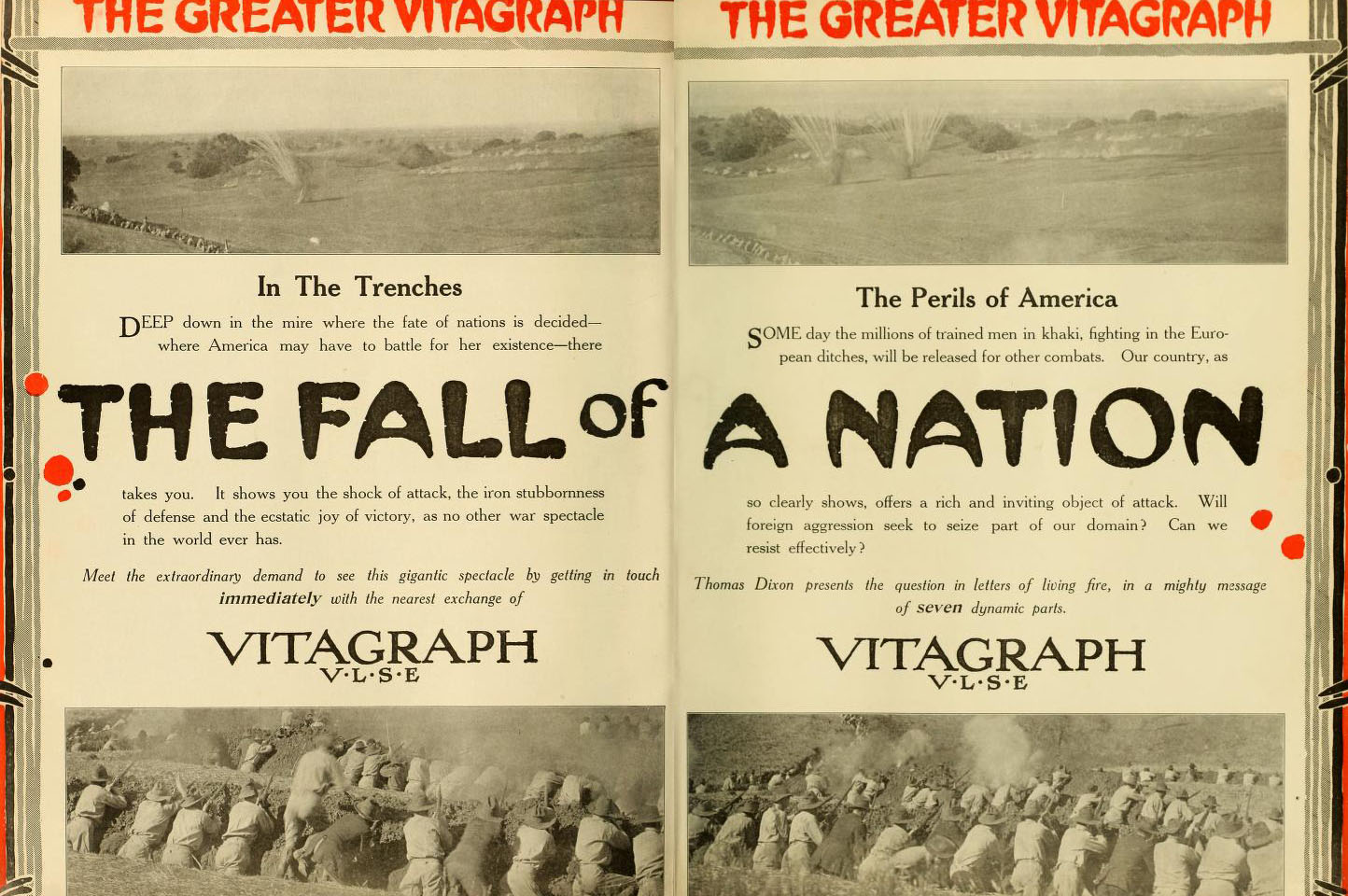
- Print advertisement
- Directed by: Thomas Dixon Jr.
- Screenplay by: Thomas Dixon Jr.
- Based on: The Fall of a Nation by Thomas Dixon Jr.
- Starring: Lorraine Huling; Percy Standing
- Cinematography: John W. Boyle
- Music by: Victor Herbert
- Production company: Dixon Studios
- Distributed by: V-L-S-E
- Release date: June 6, 1916
- Running time: 7–8 reels
- Country: United States
- Languages: Silent; English intertitles
- Budget: $31,000

The Fall of a Nation is a 1916 American silent drama film directed by Thomas Dixon Jr., and a sequel to the 1915 film The Birth of a Nation, directed by D. W. Griffith. Dixon, Jr. attempted to cash in on the success of the controversial first film. The Fall of a Nation is considered to be the first ever feature-length film sequel, though it was predated by short film sequels such as The Little Train Robbery and Sherlock Holmes II: Raffles Escaped from Prison. Based upon Dixon's novel The Fall of a Nation, the film is now lost, although the complete score survives.

== Plot ==
The Fall of a Nation is an attack on the pacifism of William Jennings Bryan and Henry Ford and a plea for American preparedness for war. America is unprepared for an attack by the "European Confederated Army", a European army headed by Germany. The army invades America and executes children and war veterans. Charles Waldron, a millionaire collaborator, accepts a title as prince of a puppet government. However, America is saved by pro-war Congressman John Vassar who raises an army to defeat the invaders with the support of the suffragette Virginia Holland. Holland forms the "Daughters of Jael," who seduce and then kill the soldiers of the occupation force. Eventually the insurgency gains the upper hand and drives out the Europeans.

== Cast ==
- Lorraine Huling as Virginia Holland
- Percy Standing as Charles Waldron / Prince Karl Von Waldron
- Arthur Shirley as John Vassar
- Flora Macdonald as Angela Benda
- Paul Willis as Billy
- Phil Gastrock as Thomas
- Clarence Geldart as General Arnold

== Production ==
Some battle scenes were filmed in the same location as The Birth of a Nation, at a cost of $31,000.

== Soundtrack ==
The film had a musical score produced by Victor Herbert. The Encyclopædia Britannica states that "this is probably the first original symphonic score composed for a feature film". An earlier music score was composed by Camille Saint-Saëns for the short (15-minute) film The Assassination of the Duke of Guise (1908); the complete soundtrack is available on YouTube.

== Reception and aftermath ==
Anthony Slide argues that the film was largely a commercial failure. The film was widely shown as propaganda by Allied governments in Europe during World War I, especially the Russian Empire. The production company, Dixon Studios, went bust in 1921, having produced only this film.

== See also ==
- The Birth of a Nation
- The Fall of a Nation (novel)
- List of lost films
- Invasion literature
