= The Fall of a Nation (novel) =

1916 novel by Thomas Dixon Jr.

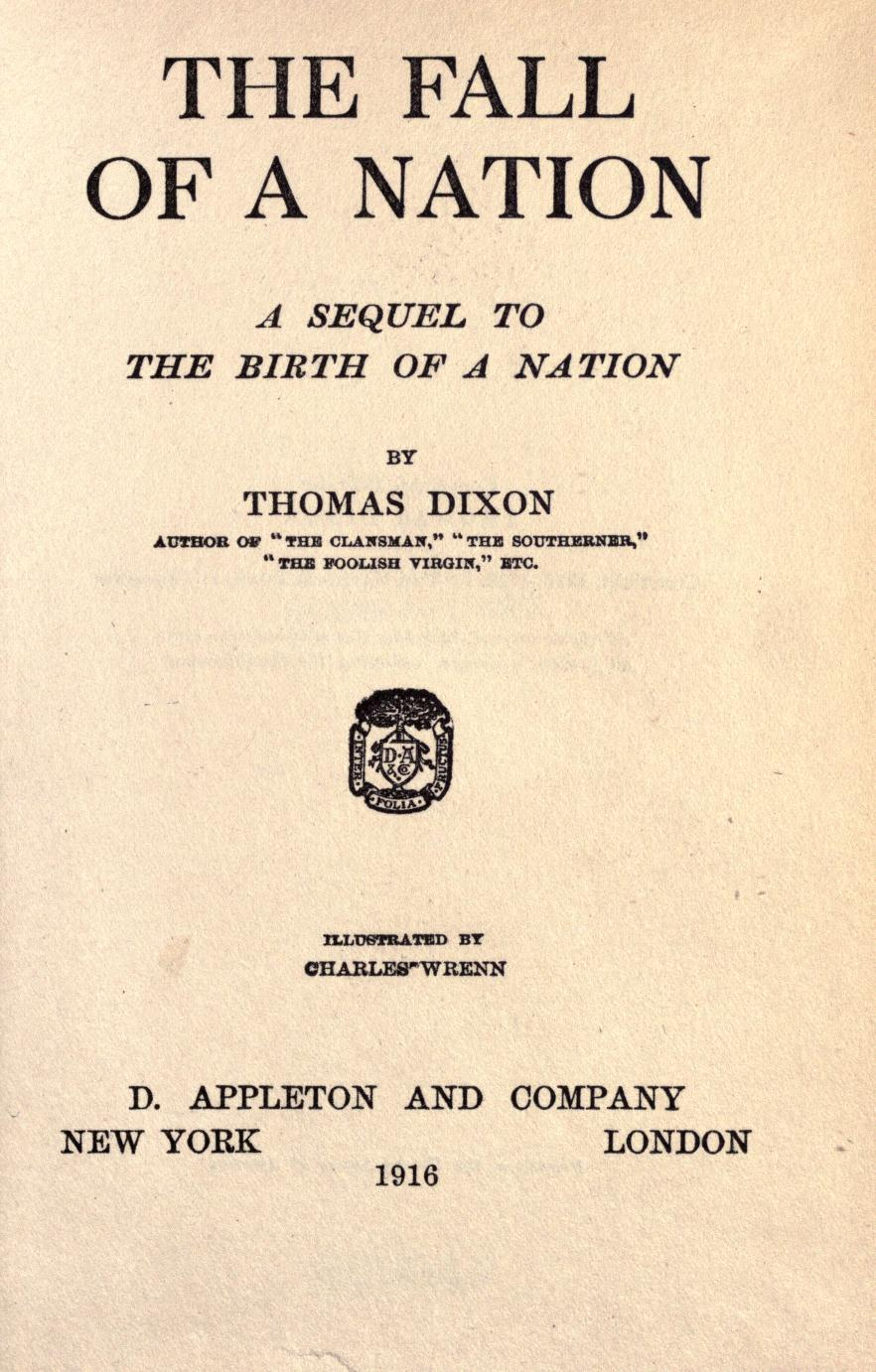
- Authors: Thomas Dixon Jr.
- Language: English
- Publisher: D. Appleton & Company
- Publication date: 1916

The Fall of a Nation, a Sequel to The Birth of a Nation is an invasion literature novel by Thomas Dixon Jr.. Dixon described it as "a burning theme, our need of preparation to defend ourselves in the world war." First published by D. Appleton & Company in 1916, Dixon directed a film version released the same year. The film is now considered lost.

== Plot ==
A European army headed by Germany invades America and executes children and war veterans. However, America is saved by a pro-war Congressman who raises an army to defeat the invaders with the support of a suffragette.

== See also ==
- The Birth of a Nation
- The Fall of a Nation
- Conquest of the United States
- Invasion literature
