= Harry Braham =

British music hall comic vocalist and actor

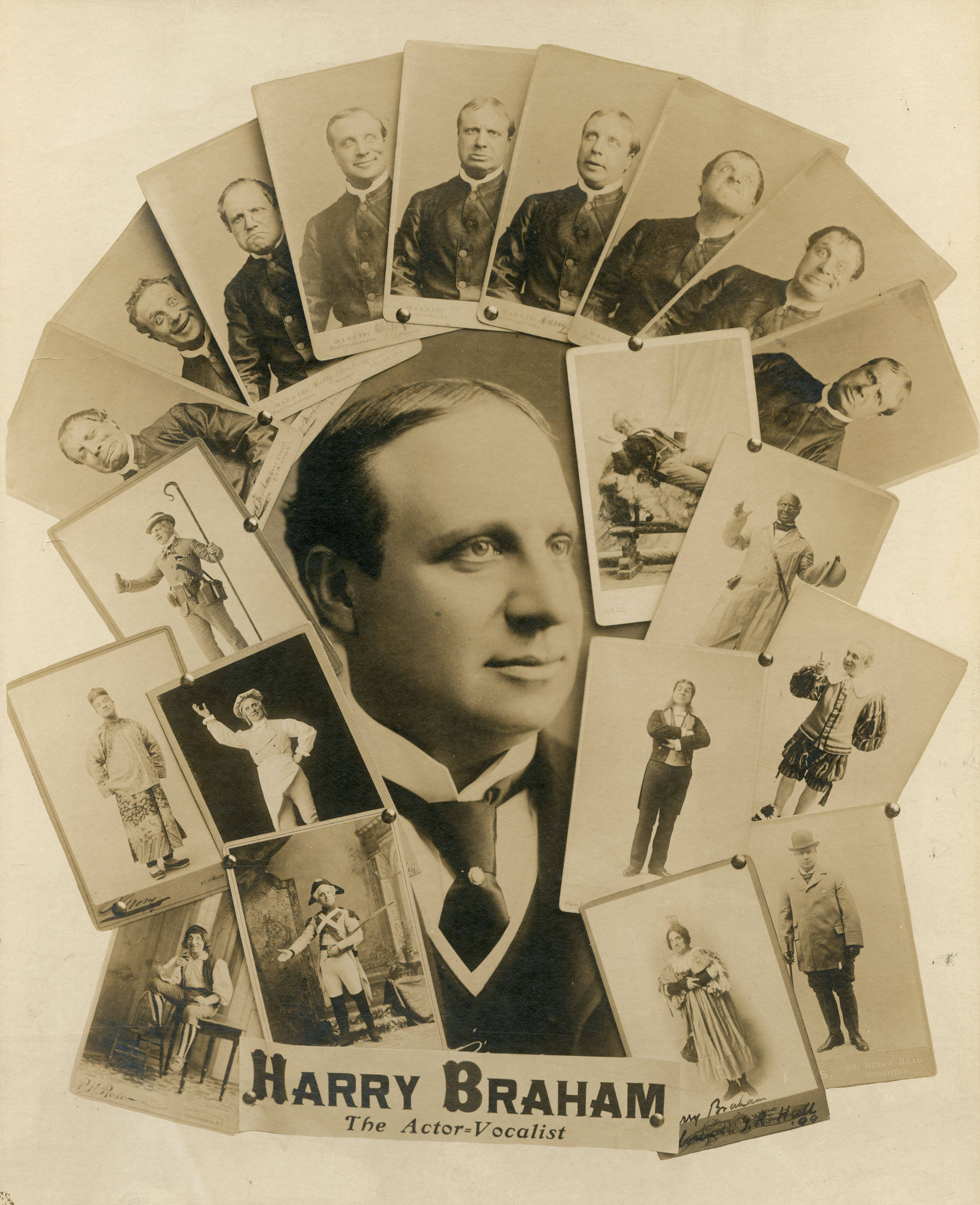
- Braham as multiple characters, 1907
- Born: Henry Nathaniel Braham; September 13, 1850; Seven Dials, London, United Kingdom
- Died: September 21, 1923 (aged 73); Staten Island, New York City, New York, U.S.
- Burial place: Cemetery of the Evergreens
- Occupations: Comic vocalist, actor
- Spouse: Lizzie Watson (m. 1873-1881)

Henry Nathaniel Braham (13 September 1850 – 21 September 1923) was a British music hall comic vocalist and actor. He toured with vaudeville impresario Tony Pastor in the 1870s and was a leading low comedian with American actor-manager William H. Crane for five years acting the part of Baron Ling Ching the Chinese Ambassador in Crane's most celebrated play, The Senator. He acted on Broadway in the light opera Sergeant Kitty with Virginia Earle, and then in silent film where he played Cameron's faithful servant (uncredited) in DW Griffith's controversial epic The Birth of a Nation.

== Early life and career ==
Braham was born in 1850 in West Street in the rookery of Seven Dials in London, to artist Nathaniel Henry Braham and Susan Dorothy Frost, his father was Jewish, his mother Anglican and this interfaith marriage caused a split in the family when they married at St Martin-in-the-Fields on 11 November 1848.

Braham had two younger brothers, Charles who became an acrobat using the name Carl Robarts, and Edwin, who had mild learning difficulties and was cared for by the family but later suffered vascular dementia and died aged 58.

Braham became a minstrel through his uncle Frederick Burgess who managed, together with George Washington (Pony) Moore, The Moore and Burgess Minstrels at the St James's Hall in Piccadilly. He then went on to tour with minstrel companies including Wilsom and Montague appearing before Queen Victoria at Balmoral in October 1868.

Braham then started a career as a solo act in music hall as a comic vocalist using his expressive face in a myriad of facial expressions, conveying different characters. He named his act "Masks and Faces".

Braham sailed to Australia in 1871 in the clipper ship St Vincent with fellow minstrel Thomas Pedder "Tommy" Hudson who was to become famous as a manager of "Hudson's Surprise Party" which later toured India and Australia.

After having success in the early music halls in Sydney, in June 1872 Braham met Lizzie Watson, born Eliza Stephenson (c. 1840 – 17 February 1913), an Irish serio-comic and Burlesque actress ten years his senior. Watson was the headline star of Harry Rickards and Enderby Jackson's music hall touring company. Watson parted company acrimoniously from Rickards to start up her own company with Braham. They married on 6 February 1873 in Brisbane, and sailed from there to Sydney in April.

After further success as a partnership, in music halls in Sydney, Brisbane, Melbourne, various surrounding towns which had benefited from the Gold Rush, such as Bathurst, West Maitland and Hill End and then in New Zealand, Braham and Watson sailed with the Billy Emerson minstrel company in June 1874 aboard the steam ship Tartar bound for San Francisco.

The ship however ran aground on a coral reef. After landing safely at Honolulu where it was scheduled to make a stop, the Emerson company, Braham and Watson did not re-board but stayed a couple of weeks during which they were unexpectedly commanded to perform before the last King of Hawaii David Kalakaua. The company then sailed on to San Francisco where Braham and Watson performed at the Bella Union Saloon in the Barbary Coast district for an unprecedented 47 weeks.

When their contract finished Braham and Watson went to New York where they impressed the famous impresario and "father of vaudeville" Tony Pastor who invited them to tour with him. In 1876 Braham devised a solo act based on the art of Commedia dell'arte calling it "Silly Bill and Father" in which a model of an old man was made with Braham holding the model while acting the part of his son on the model's back.

Braham and Watson returned to the UK in February 1878 as the highest paid entertainers of their profession, and toured all of the main music halls throughout the country, including The Crystal Palace in London.

In 1881 Braham and Watson's marriage collapsed when it was discovered Watson who had entered "widow" on their marriage certificate was still married to her husband Henry Hemingway.

== Theatre career ==
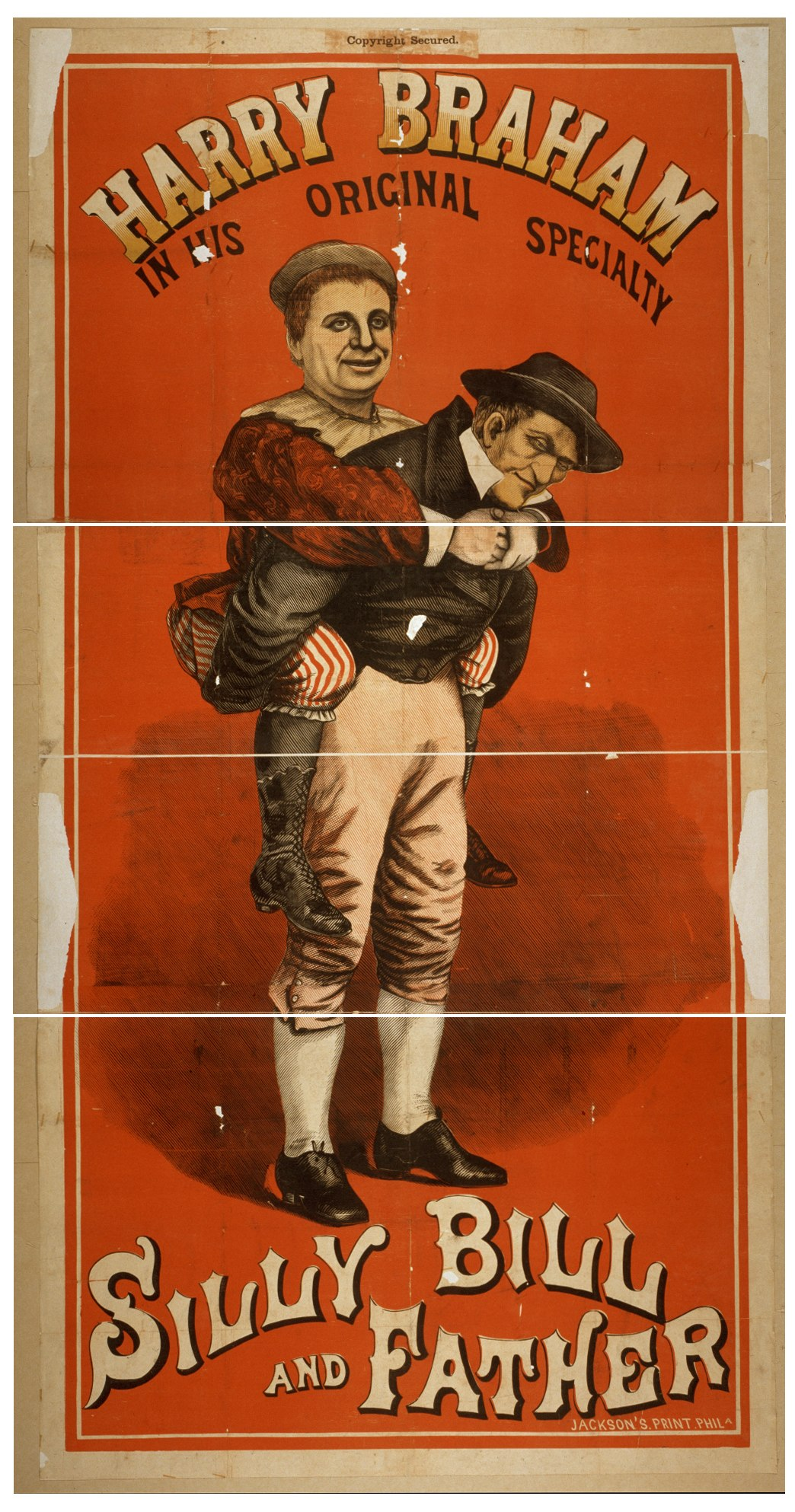
Braham in one of his stage acts, "Silly Bill and father"

Braham carried on his solo career appearing with many of the "A-list" stars of the period such as Dan Leno, Vesta Tilley, and Arthur Lloyd. He then went to the US with his act "Masks And Faces" in 1887 and was approached to act in his first play on the legitimate stage, which was unusual for music hall artistes who did not usually transfer to the genre. This play Hoodman Blind was based on Othello in which he played the part of the blacksmith "Ben Chibbles" to wide acclaim for 35 weeks. Braham then acted in Steele Mackaye's play Paul Kauvar (also entitled Anarchy) as Dodolphe Potin.

In 1889, William H. Crane, an influential actor-manager who was a personal friend of the President Grover Cleveland, signed him to be part of his company which included Georgie Drew Barrymore and subsequently Agnes Booth. For the next five years he played the part of Baron Ling Ching in Crane's most successful play, The Senator, among many others.

In February 1891 Braham's father died suddenly, but Braham could not break his contract halfway through the season, and while travelling back to the UK in June on board the steam ship City Of Richmond, the ship, which was carrying bales of cotton, caught fire during a storm mid-Atlantic. 3 ships – the City of Paris, the Servia and the Counsellor came to its rescue. One, the Counsellor was involved in a crisis of its own when the captain John G Jones dropped dead while signaling the Richmond's captain Redford.

In 1894 Braham parted from Crane and starred in Moses and Son, a play written specially for him. The play was a commercial failure and he returned to Europe, to star in Arthur Branscombe's successful play Morocco Bound.

In 1895 Braham's mother Susan died and after a period of mourning he returned to the music hall circuit appearing in 1899 at the Crystal Palace London with Loie Fuller pioneer of dance and lighting, famous for her serpentine dance. Braham appeared with Fuller again in the USA.

In 1900 Braham returned to the USA permanently and naturalised as an American citizen on 8 March.

In 1903 Braham went to Jamaica as headline act with the English Dramatic and Comedy Concert Party and returned to the US to act as Picorin the Baker in George R White's production of Sergeant Kitty with Virginia Earle, premiering on Broadway on 18 January 1904 at Daly's Theatre. It played until 12 March 1904 (55 performances).

In 1907 Braham went on a major tour of the western USA in his solo act entitled "One Hundred Faces and Characters from Charles Dickens." Dickens had made his last reading at the St James Hall in London in March 1870 when Braham's uncle was manager of the minstrels there.

== Films and last years ==
Braham switched between his solo act and legitimate theatre before going into film. in 1912 he acted in the short Suppressed Evidence, in 1913 The Vengeance of Heaven, and in 1915 The Fight.

Braham's most important role, though uncredited, was in DW Griffith's major epic The Birth of a Nation which also starred Lillian Gish. Braham, who acted in blackface for the part of Cameron's servant as required by Griffith, was seen both in the first and second half defending his "master" Dr Cameron and can be seen with Gish at the end of the film racing by cart to a hut and being cornered by soldiers where Braham fights to the death.

Braham acted in his last play, another light opera Miss Springtime by Klaw and Erlanger, with some lyrics by PG Wodehouse in 1917.

Braham developed a kidney complaint and, unable to work, became destitute. He became a resident guest at the Actors' Fund home West Brighton Staten Island. He was diagnosed with "heart inflammation" in August 1923 and taken to Staten Island Hospital where he died on 21 September, eight days after his 73rd birthday.

Braham's funeral took place at Frank Campbell's funeral home on Broadway, he was cremated and his ashes interred in the Actors' plot Evergreen Cemetery Brooklyn New York.

== Filmography ==
Year	Title	Role	Notes
1915	The Birth of a Nation	Cameron's Male Servant	Uncredited
1915	The Fight	Throckmorton	(final film role)

== Sources ==
- Harry Braham at IMDb
- "Harry Braham on Internet Broadway database". IBDB.
- New York Times (22 September 1923). "Harry Braham".
- Fields, Armond (2011) [2007]. Tony Pastor Father of Vaudeville (reprint ed.). McFarland & Co Inc. ISBN 978-0786464241.
- New York Variety (27 September 1923). "Obituary".
- The Daily Standard Union Brooklyn (18 June 1911). "Harry Braham".
- The Anaconda Standard (17 April 1901). "An Accidental Sweetheart".
- The New York Dramatic Mirror (13 April 1907). "Harry Braham".
- The Daily Graphic New York (12 April 1889). "Men Met About Town".
- The New York Sun (15 September 1934). "Shenandoah".
- Buffalo Evening News (21 September 1923). "Harry Braham".
- Muir, Janet (2014). Masks and Faces: The Life and Career of Harry Braham. Chaplin Books. ISBN 978-1909183506.
- Pollak, Michael (21 December 2012). "The First Actors Home". New York Times.
