= The Senator (play) =

1890 play by David D. Lloyd and Sydney Rosenfeld, and 1915 film by Joseph A. Golden

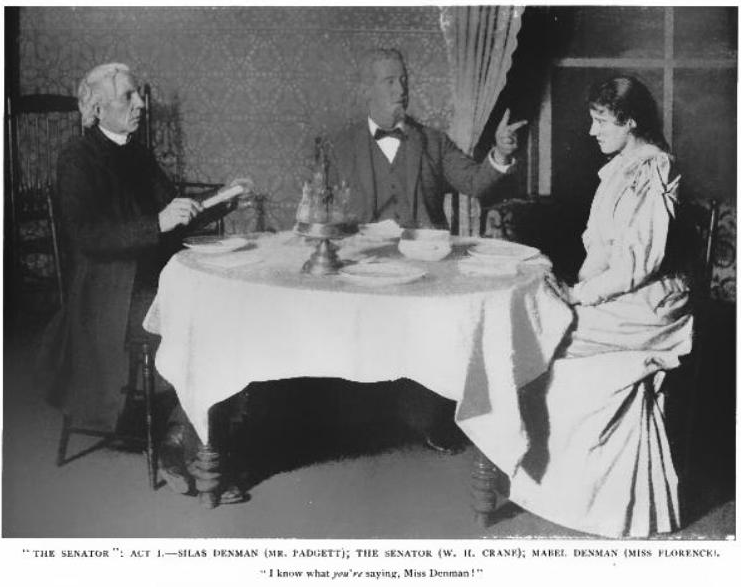
- Scene from the play
- Original language: English
- Written by: David D. Lloyd and Sydney Rosenfeld

Premiere
- Date: January 13, 1890 (New York)
- Place: Star Theatre

The Senator was a popular 1890 comedic play by David D. Lloyd and Sydney Rosenfeld, also made into a 1915 silent film.

== Play ==
Rosenfeld, a prolific writer and adapter of plays, completed the play after Lloyd died; it is not known for sure how much Rosenfeld did to revise the text. He himself claimed to have made major revisions (though acknowledging the unfairness of claiming such when Lloyd could not dispute it), while some critics suggested he just made minor alterations, perhaps supposing that Rosenfeld himself was not capable of producing such fine product. After initial performances outside New York (it was first performed in St. Louis) it debuted at the Star Theatre on Broadway on January 13, 1890, and ran for 119 performances.

The play starred actor William H. Crane and Georgie Drew Barrymore. After it closed on Broadway, Crane continued to perform the play for the next three seasons, and it was considered one of the highlight roles of his career, as well as Barrymore's.

The plot is based on a true story of a claim for damages from the War of 1812 for the sinking of the brig General Armstrong which was not resolved for 70 years.

The title character of Senator Hannibal Rivers was modeled on Senator Preston B. Plumb of Kansas. When Plumb saw the play he was surprised to see Crane wearing a stovepipe hat, commenting to Crane that "I never wore a silk hat in my life, and my creditors wouldn't know me for myself in a head piece like that." Crane threw the hat down and declared he wouldn't wear it again, though he continued to do so, at least in New York. According to a biography of Plumb, before one performance of the play in Washington, D.C., Senator Blackburn of Kentucky "told Crane to vigorously rub the back of his neck with a large white handkerchief when excited as that was a habit with Plumb in debate." Twenty-four U.S. Senators were in the audience for the performance, and upon seeing that move "roared with laughter" though the general audience had no idea of the cause.

The play saw frequent productions around the United States through the 1890s and early 1900s, and was revived in Washington, D.C. as late as 1914. The play was revived once more in 2023 in Casper, Wyoming, after Johanna Wickman rediscovered the script while researching a biography of Senator Plumb. The three performances were live-streamed and remain on YouTube to the public.

T. Daniel Frawley, who was in the original cast, later obtained the rights to perform the play in the Western U.S., and enjoyed success with his own company. Frawley later opined that everyone involved in the original production seemed to have met with success. In addition to the crowning performances by Crane and Barrymore, for instance, he noted that Jane Stuart later "became a star" herself before marrying General Auer, a Milwaukee millionaire—one of three of the cast's females to marry millionaires.

== Film ==
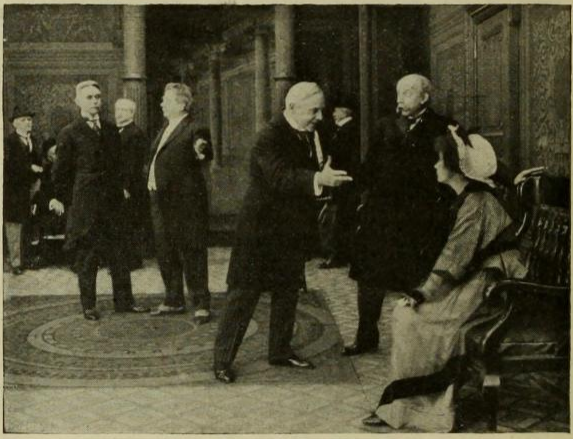
Still from 1915 film.

The 1915 silent film version, a five-reel production released in December of that year, was directed by Joseph A. Golden for Triumph Film Corporation. Charles J. Ross starred as Senator Rivers.

It is not known whether the film currently survives.

== Cast of 1890 play ==
- William H. Crane as Senator Rivers
- George F. Devere as Alexander Armstrong
- Henry Bergman as Count Ernest von Strahl
- Harry Braham as Baron Ling Ching
- James Neill as Richard Vance
- T. Daniel Frawley as Lieut. George Schuyler
- W. Herbert as Isaiah Sharpless
- J.C. Padgett as Silas Denman
- John J. Gilmartin as Erastus
- Lizzie Hudson Collier as Mabel Denman
- Augusta Foster as Mrs. Schuyler (*Mrs. Augusta Foster, per Daniel Blum)
- Jennie Karsner as Mrs. Armstrong
- Jane Stuart as Josie Armstrong
- Georgie Drew Barrymore as Mrs. Hilary

== Cast of 1915 film ==
- Charles J. Ross as Senator Rivers
- Joseph Burke as Senator Keene
- Ben Graham as Silas Denman
- Thomas F. Tracey as Secretary Armstrong
- Philip Hahn as Count Ernst von Strahl
- Dixie Compton as Mrs. Hilary
- Constance Mollineaux as Mabel Denman
- Gene Luneska as Mrs. Armstrong
- William Corbett

== Cast of 2023 Revival ==
- William T. Wallace as Senator Hannibal Rivers
- Kenneth Marken as Secretary Armstrong
- Brandon Paad as Count von Strahl
- Caitlin Grosenheider as Mabel Denman
- Dob Wallace as Silas Denman
- Lindsey Scott as Adelaide Hilary
- Drew Stratton as Isaiah Sharpless
- Vincent Grund as Richard Vance
- Julia Conte as Josie Armstrong
- Daniel Igleheart as Lieutenant George Schuyler
- Heidi Dickerson as Mrs. Lucy Armstrong
- Laurel Blake as Mrs. Margaret Schuyler
- Asheton Capps as Baron Ling Ching

Footage of this cast from a shared YouTube link
