= Thomas P. Hudson =

English stage performer (1852–1909)

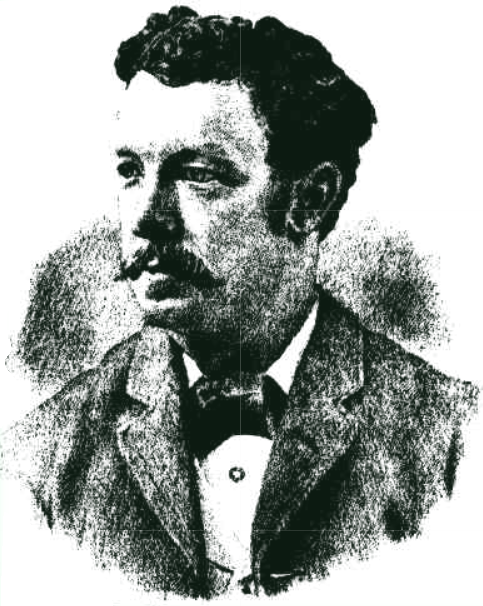
Thomas P. Hudson

Thomas Pedder Hudson (1852 – 28 June 1909) was an English stage performer who had a considerable career in Australia as comedian and manager of the variety troupe Hudson's Surprise Party. Hudson brought Antoinette Sterling to Australia, and was manager for George Musgrove of Nellie Melba's 1902 tour of Australasia.

== History ==
Hudson was born in Brooklyn, New York, to Samuel Hudson and Sarah Ann Hudson, née Morris, but grew up in Manchester, England, where he showed an early interest in theatre. At age seven his performance in the People's Hall (Note: Perhaps the old Manchester Town Hall) was noticed by E. D. Davies and Alfred Wood, notably for his "pedestal dance". (Note: Pedestal dance: clog dancing on a box or similar; Hudson used a stand 5 feet (1.5 m) high.) In 1867 he arrived in Melbourne and two years later had settled in Adelaide.

According to one report, Hudson's first performance in Australia was in the 1860s, (Note: This in an obituary that characterised the others as "scrappy and inaccurate", also guessed his birth year at around 1840.) It has also been said he used the stage name Bradley early in his career.

Tommy Hudson and Harry Braham formed a partnership and left Plymouth for Australia aboard St Vincent on 6 September 1871 and arrived in Adelaide on 25 November. They opened there in December 1871, followed by Melbourne and Sydney in a minstrel troupe whose members included Lizzie Watson (who married Braham), basso Ted Amery and a Mr Wood.

They alternated between India and Australia almost every year in that decade; in 1878 as the "United States Minstrels" accompanied by Mrs Hudson and Mrs Braham, Charles Holly (real name Hawley) and Mrs Holly and child, and Messrs Owen Conduit, G. W. Rockefeller (later their manager), Thomas Rainford, J. Thompson, E. Amery, R. W. Kohler, B. Barney, and W. C. Hawkins, the "male soprano".

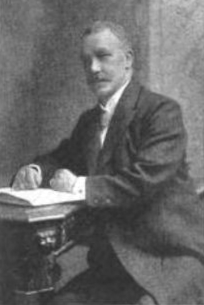
In The Sketch, 27 July 1898

The partnership then broke up, Braham and Watson forming a variety company with many of the original Rickards' troupers, and Hudson returning to Australia in 1879 with his "Hudson Surprise party". This troupe included violinist Vena De Gay and her pianist sister Florence De Gay, singers Ada Maven (real name Amelia Salter, sister of Frank Herbert and the lady baritone, Milly Herbert), "treble-voiced" Amy Rowe (married name Rebecca Richardson) and Milly Norton, and vocalist comedians Edmund Glover and Charles Wallace. They took over White's Rooms in Adelaide, as a base for touring Australasia, also China, Japan, Burma and, notably, India. Hudson was managing the Royal and Corinthian theatres in Calcutta, in addition to White's Rooms, from 1884 renamed the "Bijou".

In 1893 Hudson brought Antoinette Sterling to Australia. The contralto, characterised as "one of the cleverest self-advertisers Australia has ever known", had gained wide appeal by eschewing "classical" works for familiar ballads. Support artists included the soprano Isabel Webster and tenor James Wood from Melbourne, the Adelaide basso H. R. "Bert" Holder and pianist May Habgood, Hudson's wife.

Hudson was taken on by George Musgrove as general manager for Nellie Melba's tour of Australia which opened in Melbourne on 24 September 1902, followed by Melbourne and Brisbane. She then returned to Melbourne, staying in fashionable Toorak for the Cup season, The tour was highly profitable; takings in one evening in Sydney amounted to £2790, several million dollars in today's values. The tour crossed to New Zealand in 1903, playing Dunedin on 14 January, followed by Wellington and Auckland before crossing to San Francisco.

== Personal ==
Hudson married Jane Pickering in Melbourne on 13 March 1874. He lived with vocalist Ada Maven (real name Amelia Salter) for around ten years, then on 20 May 1888 he married the pianist May Eleanor Habgood A.R.C.M., (Note: Salter then had him arrested, claiming he owed her around three years' wages, which she had voluntarily foregone in the expectation of a marriage. On 19 July 1888 she married Frank Opitz and two years later had her own touring company.) who died 12 November 1898, aged 32. They had two sons. He married one more time, to Violet Gertrude Taylor, daughter of Sydney alderman John Taylor.

After the Melba tour, little was heard from the smart, tactful, energetic, and diplomatic man, for which qualities he was dubbed "Bismarck Hudson" by Melba, and died in Bournemouth, England.
