= Arlene White Lawrence =

American Protestant bishop

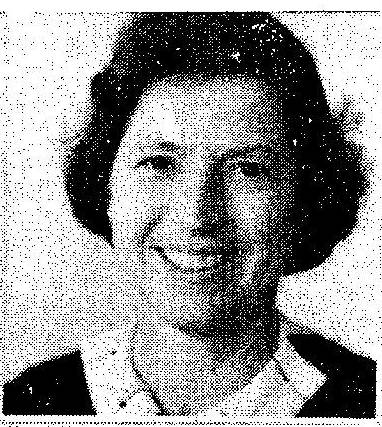
- Lawrence, c. 1965

3rd General Superintendent of Pillar of Fire International
- In office 1975–1984
- Preceded by: Arthur Kent White
- Succeeded by: Donald Justin Wolfram

Personal details
- Born: Arlene Hart White; November 11, 1916 Zarephath, New Jersey, U.S.
- Died: November 10, 1990 (aged 73) Belle Mead, New Jersey, U.S.
- Resting place: Fairmount Cemetery
- Spouse: Evan Jerry Lawrence (1918–1983)
- Children: Arthur Lawrence; Verona Lawrence Friedley
- Parent(s): Arthur Kent White; Kathleen Merrell Staats
- Relatives: Alma White, grandmother Horace White, brother Constance White, sister Pauline (White) Dallenbach, sister

Arlene Hart White Lawrence (November 11, 1916 – November 10, 1990) was a bishop and the third president and general superintendent of the Pillar of Fire Church, a Protestant denomination which in 1966 operated church congregations, missionary homes, radio stations, publishing operations, farms, schools and colleges from 54 properties around the world. The denomination was founded in Denver, Colorado, by her grandmother, Alma Bridwell White, the first woman to become a bishop in the US. She believed that "activities such as gambling and dancing take time from the really important activities of life". She was the president of all three church radio stations, KPOF in Westminster, Colorado; WAWZ in the Zarephath section of Franklin Township, Somerset County, New Jersey; and WAKW in Cincinnati, Ohio.

== Biography ==
She was born on November 11, 1916, the daughter of Kathleen Merrell and Arthur Kent White (1889-1981). Her siblings include Horace White (1920-?) who married Evelyn and lived in California; Constance White (1924- ) who married David Brown; and Pauline White (1927-2019) a pastor, who married Robert B. Dallenbach, a bishop in the church in Denver.

She married E. Jerry Lawrence, a bishop in the church.

She was one of the first people to broadcast on the local Pillar of Fire radio station, KPOF in 1928. She and her sisters sang as the White Sisters Trio, with Arlene accompanying the Trio on the violin.

She attended schools in Westminster, Colorado, and graduated from Alma White College in 1941. She later earned a master's degree from Columbia University.

In 1943 she was ordained as an elder in the Pillar of Fire church, and was consecrated as a bishop in 1974. Her father, Arthur Kent White, retired in 1975. She became president and general superintendent of the church, and she retired in 1984.

She died on November 10, 1990, at her home in the Belle Mead section of Montgomery Township, New Jersey, and was buried in Fairmount Cemetery in Denver.

== Publications/media ==
- Come Along (1956)
- Lady Blue Bell's Forest Banquet (1973) Vantage Press, 44 pages
- Weekly News and Notes column in the Pillar of Fire magazine
- Hosted Saturday morning children's bible story program on WAWZ-FM
