= Donald Justin Wolfram =

American religious leader

4th General Superintendent of Pillar of Fire International
- In office 1984–2000
- Preceded by: Arlene White
- Succeeded by: Robert Barney Dallenbach

Personal details
- Born: November 13, 1919 Zarephath, New Jersey
- Died: August 25, 2003 (aged 83) Westminster, Colorado
- Cause of death: Pancreatic cancer
- Resting place: Belleview Cemetery
- Spouse: Phyllis Ester Hoffman (1921-1985) (m. 1948–1985)
- Parent(s): Gertrude Metlen (1888-1959); Albert L. Wolfram (1877-1962)
- Relatives: Gordon W. Wolfram (1922-1992), brother Orland A. Wolfram, brother Alma White, grandaunt
- Occupation: Religious leader, educator, and administrator

Donald Justin Wolfram (November 13, 1919 – August 25, 2003) was the fourth General Superintendent of the Pillar of Fire Church from 1984 to 2000.

== Biography ==
He was born November 13, 1919, in the Zarephath section of Franklin Township, Somerset County, New Jersey, to Gertrude Metlen (1888-1959) and Albert Wolfram (1877-1962). Both were missionaries in the Pillar of Fire Church. Gertrude Metlen was the daughter of the former Venora Ella Bridwell (sister of Alma Bridwell White, founder of the Pillar of Fire) and David Evans Metlen of Dillon, Montana. Gertrude had the following siblings: Bruce Joseph Metlen; Genevieve E. Metlen; and Dale E. Metlen. None of her siblings married or had children. Gertrude and Albert had married in 1909. Wolfram had two siblings: Orland A. Wolfram (1912-1987) who died in Guatemala; and Gordon W. Wolfram (1922-1992).

He was ordained as a minister in 1935 at age 16. He earned his B.S. from Alma White College. He next obtained his M.S. from Columbia University, and his Ph.D. from the University of Denver. He married Phyllis Esther Hoffman (1921-1985) on December 20, 1948, and had the following children: Suzanne Wolfram who married David M. Larue; Phillip J. Wolfram who married Neta L. M.; Charlene L. W. who married Keith R. Maines; Donna J. W. who married Ron R. Reiner; and Lorraine J. Wolfram who married Bruce Lepley. Wolfram taught at the Pillar of Fire high schools and colleges and was the dean of Belleview College in Westminster, Colorado. He was co-pastor of the Pillar of Fire Alma Temple in Denver. He had a radio program on KPOF. He also had several programs on WAWZ in New Jersey and WAKW in Cincinnati.

He served as the 4th General Superintendent of Pillar of Fire International starting in 1984, he stepped down in 2000 from his illness. He died on August 25, 2003, of pancreatic cancer. He was buried in Belleview Cemetery in Westminster, Colorado.
