= Alma White College =

Bible college in Zarephath, New Jersey, U.S.

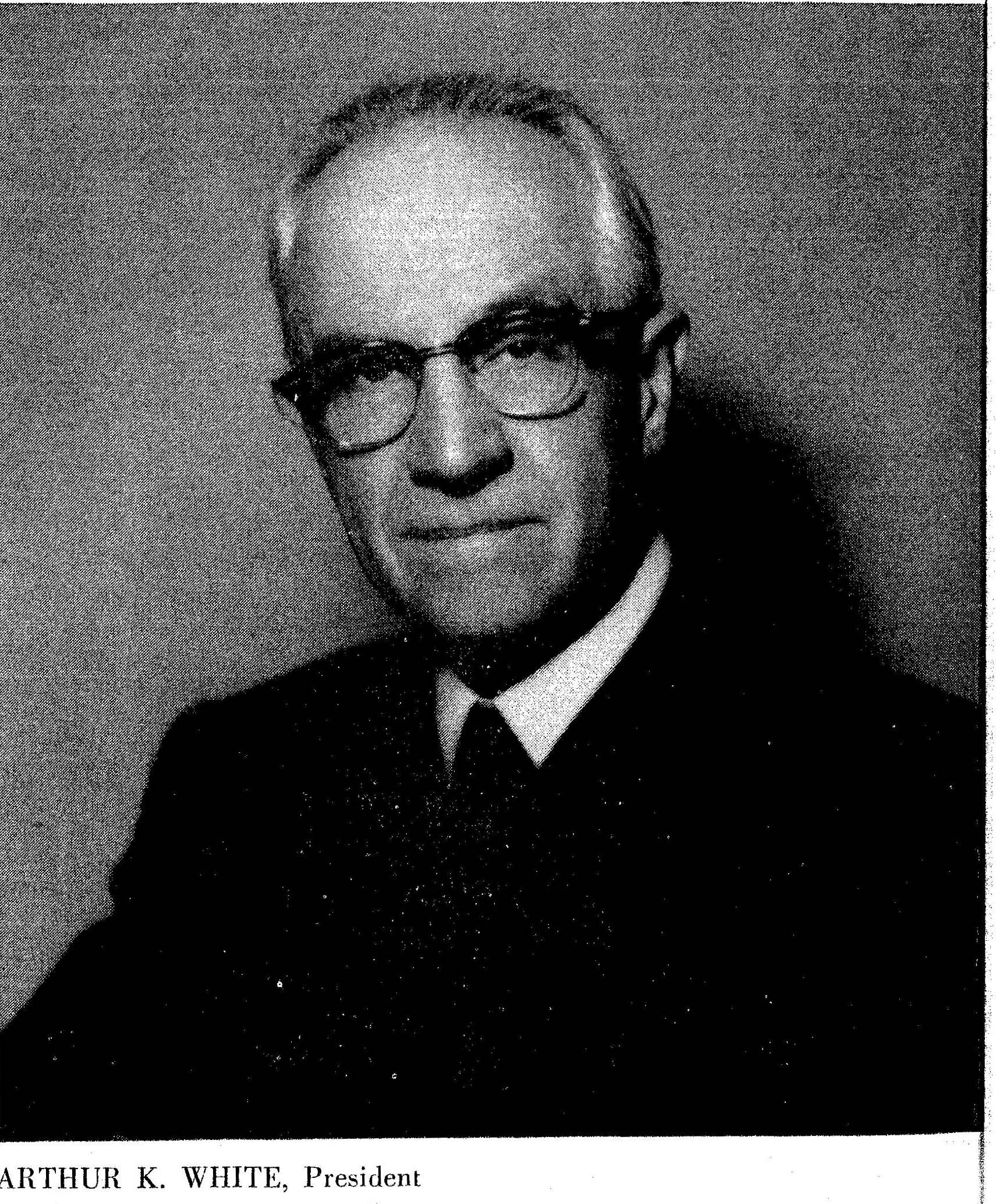
Arthur Kent White was president from 1921 to 1971

Alma White College was a Bible college in Zarephath, New Jersey from 1921 to 1978. It was an institution of the Pillar of Fire Church. The academic institution is now succeeded by Pillar College.

== History ==
In June 1917 an elderly German professor came to Zarephath, the headquarters of the Pillar of Fire, and offered to teach college level classes. Several other classes were organized around a standard college curriculum.

The college was first allowed by the New Jersey Department of Education to grant Bachelor of Arts and Bachelor of Science degrees in 1921 and the name Alma White College was chosen. Alma White's son, Arthur Kent White was the first president starting in 1921. Alma White was the founder of the church.

In 1923 the Ku Klux Klan in New Jersey provided funding for the school, allowing it to become "the second institution in the north avowedly run by the Ku Klux Klan to further its aims and principles." Alma White said that the Klan philosophy "will sweep through the intellectual student classes as through the masses of the people." At that time, the Pillar of Fire was publishing the pro-KKK monthly periodical The Good Citizen. In 1927 the college conferred its first Doctor of Divinity degree. Arthur Kent White retired as president in 1971.

The college made the decision to shut down its liberal arts and science programs. The state gave the school permission to allow the students already enrolled to complete their studies until graduation.

It graduated its last student in June 1978.

The buildings suffered heavy damage in 1971, 1999, and 2011 from flooding on the Delaware and Raritan Canal and the Millstone River.

After the closing of the college, the Pillar of Fire continued to operate Zarephath Bible Institute [ZBI], which historically had operated on the campus. In early 2001, on the same campus, the Pillar of Fire founded Somerset Christian College.

Following the flooding caused by Hurricane Irene in 2011, the Zarephath campus buildings have been condemned, and all classes meet at Stonecrest Church in Warren, New Jersey.

== Administration ==
- Arthur Kent White was president from 1921 to 1971.
- Gertrude Metlen Wolfram (1888–1959) was the dean of the college.

== Notable and noteworthy graduates ==
- Arthur Kent White honorary D.D. (1927)
- Alton Milford Young, D.D. (1927)
- Donald Justin Wolfram, B.A.
- Robert Barney Dallenbach, B.A.
- Joseph Gross, current general superintendent, Pillar of Fire International
- Johannes Maas (B.A. 1958), president of Worldwide Faith Missions
- John Gross, former president, WEC International
- James P. Butler class of 1971. Retired after 38 years as a Team Leader with the N.J. Superior Court Criminal Division. Earned a master's degree from FDU in 1986. Six other graduates in 1971 went on to become Probation Officers, Chief of Detectives/Public Safety Director, Supervisor of the New Mexico Highway Patrol, Funeral Director

== See also ==
- Pillar of Fire International
- Somerset Christian College

| Preceded by Zarephath Bible Institute | Education at Zarephath, New Jersey; 1921-1978 | Succeeded by Somerset Christian College |
