= Kathleen Merrell White =

American minister & writer (1889–1973)

Kathleen Merell White
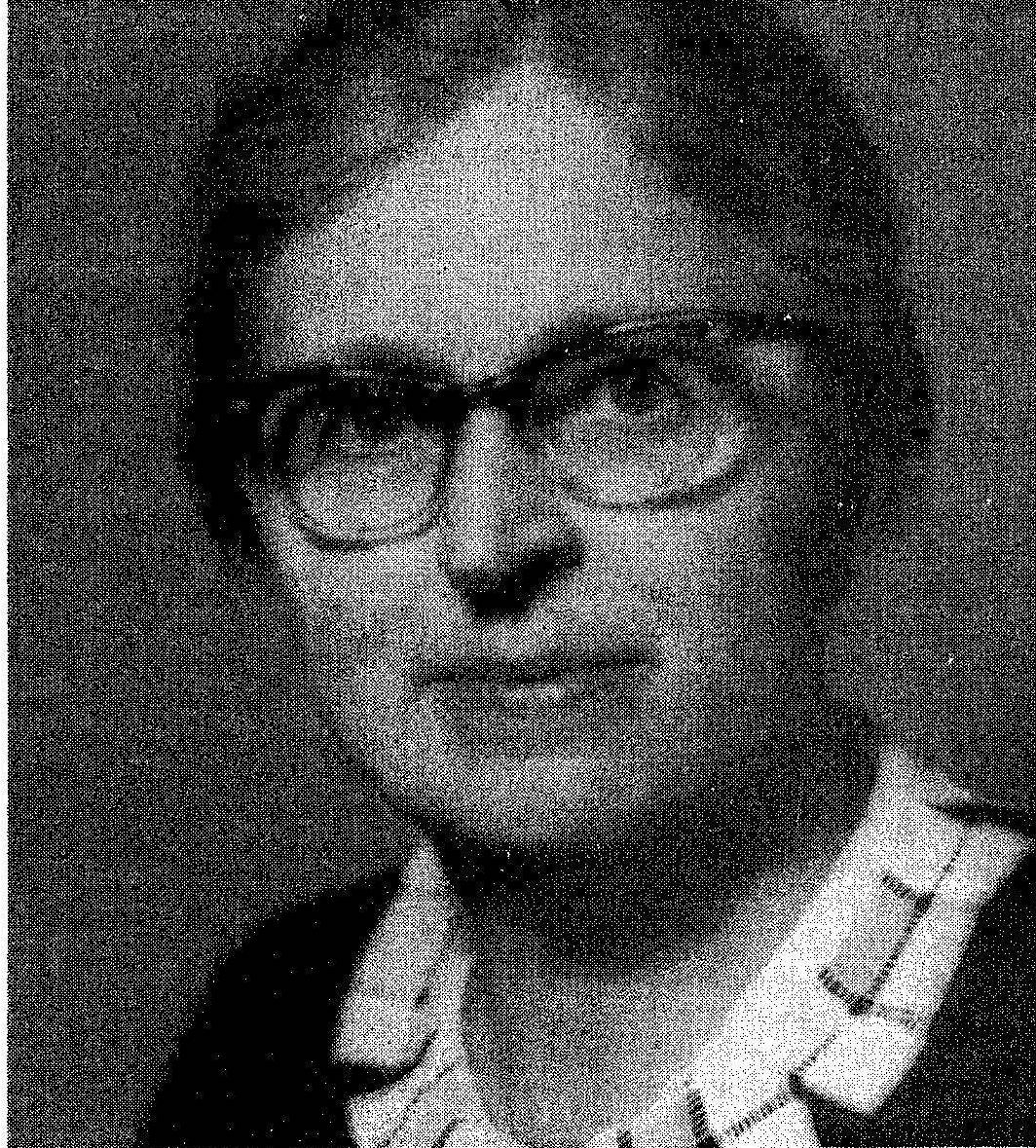
- Born: Kathleen Merrell Staats; November 25, 1889; Zarephath, New Jersey
- Died: April 1, 1973 (aged 83); Zarephath, New Jersey
- Occupations: Superintendent of schools; financial agent; vice president; assistant superintendent
- Spouse: Arthur Kent White (m. 1914–1973)
- Children: Arlene White Lawrence; Pauline White Dallenbach; Horace White; Constance White Brown

Kathleen Merell White (née Staats; November 25, 1889 – April 1, 1973) was an American minister, author, and senior leader in the Pillar of Fire Church, a Protestant denomination founded in 1901 by Bishop Alma White, Kathleen's mother-in-law.

== Biography ==
She was born on November 25, 1889, to Anna F. and William Staats. Over the course of her career with the Pillar of Fire Church she held numerous titles including Financial Agent, Superintendent of Schools, Vice President, and Assistant Superintendent. She married Bishop Arthur Kent White, the Church's second general superintendent, and together they jointly ran the Pillar of Fire Church from 1946 until her death in 1973.

Kathleen White was also the granddaughter of Caroline Van Neste Field Garretson, the widow who donated her farm in Somerset County, New Jersey to Bishop Alma White, the founder of the Pillar of Fire Church. Bishop White gave the farm and ensuing community the name of Zarephath, after the Old Testament's Widow of Zarephath. Zarephath would eventually become the Pillar of Fire Church's communal headquarters.

Kathleen and Arthur were married in 1914, six years after Kathleen's grandmother Caroline made the donation of the large farm to Arthur's mother, Bishop White, in 1908. Kathleen died on April 1, 1973, in Zarephath, New Jersey.

== Politics ==
Like her mother-in-law, Kathleen was a strong advocate for women's equality, especially within the Church's structure. According to Susie Stanley, "While many clergy sanctioned a narrow understanding of women's sphere, Kathleen White of the Pillar of Fire Church found no evidence of divine approval for woman's sphere." Stanley quotes Kathleen White as writing: "Jesus had nothing to say about woman's place: Never so far as we know, did He utter a single sentence in abridgement of the domestic, social, or religious privileges of women; and never by His actions or words did He show any discrimination against them."

Kathleen was also a fervent advocate for temperance. She wrote and lectured extensively on the subject and eventually published a book titled Drunk Stuff. In the preface she wrote:

My personal abhorrence of intoxicants dates back to my childhood. Not that liquor was ever a personal or family problem, but as a child the dread of an intoxicated man possessed me. The opportunity to fight this evil came when I dedicated my life to missionary endeavor and preaching in the Pillar of Fire Church. I am indebted to Alma White, my husband's mother, for much of my inspiration, and am convinced that unrestrained liquor indulgence must cease to be a part of the American way of life if our civilization is saved.

== Publications ==
Rev. White wrote one book, Drunk Stuff, wrote numerous articles for the periodicals The Dry Legion and Woman's Chains, and published four hymns in the Cross and Crown Hymnal. The hymns were titled Tell It All to Jesus, Spring Days, Tiny Sunbeams and Happy Children. She is also credited for writing the arrangement for Bishop Alma White's hymn Teach the Children.

Happy Children (1925)

Happy children, blithe and gay,
Laughing all the live-long day;
Who will guide them in the truth
While they're in the boom of youth?

Tender lives like little flow'rs,
Blighted soon, by Satan's pow'rs
Shall we let them droop and die
With no hope as time rolls by?

Satan wants to wreck their lives,
Mar the good that in them lies,
Wound their little minds and hearts,
Slyly with his cruel darts.

Guard them from life's chilling blast,
Watch till danger all is past;
Guide their little feet aright,
Lead them on to heav'nly light.

Chorus
O, go out and bring them in,
From the snares of vice and sin,
They are waiting for your hand,
Guide them to the promised land.
