= Arthur Kent White =

American bishop (1889–1981)

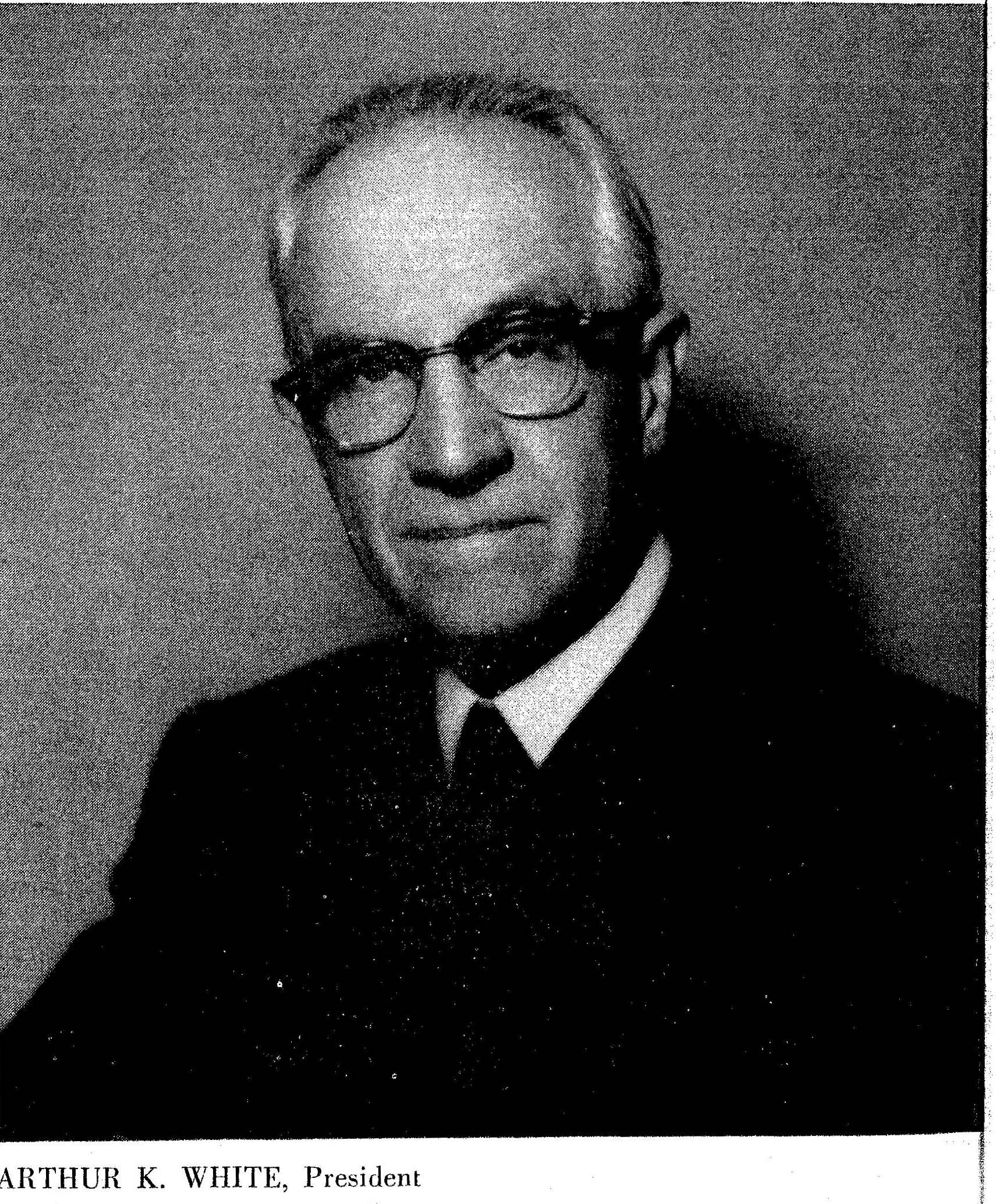

2nd General Superintendent of the Pillar of Fire Church
- In office 1946–1981
- Preceded by: Alma Bridwell White
- Succeeded by: Arlene White Lawrence

President of Alma White College
- In office 1921–1971

Personal details
- Born: March 15, 1889 Denver, Colorado, U.S.
- Died: September 16, 1981 (aged 92) Zarephath, New Jersey, U.S.
- Spouse(s): Kathleen Merrell (m. 1914; died 1973) Bertha White
- Children: Arlene White Lawrence
- Parent: Alma Bridwell White
- Relatives: Ray Bridwell White, brother
- Education: Columbia University (A.B., 1915); Princeton University (M.A., 1917); Alma White College (D.D., 1927)

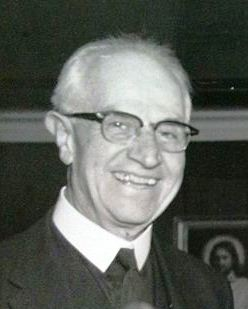
Arthur Kent White in 1956

Arthur Kent White (March 15, 1889 – September 16, 1981) was a bishop, and the general superintendent of the Pillar of Fire Church in Zarephath, New Jersey, and the president of Belleview College. The church was started by his mother, Alma Bridwell White, in Denver, Colorado.

== Biography ==
He was born in Denver, Colorado, in 1889 to Alma Bridwell and Kent White (1860–1940), and he had a brother, Ray Bridwell White.

Arthur attended and graduated from Columbia University with an A.B. in 1915. He later attended and graduated from Princeton University, and he received an honorary Doctor of Divinity from Alma White College in 1927. He married Kathleen Merrell White in 1914, and had the following children: Arlene White (1916–1990), who married Jerry Lawrence, and was a bishop at Zarephath, New Jersey; Horace White (b. 1920), who lived in California; Constance White (b. 1924); and Pauline White (b. 1927), who married Robert Barney Dallenbach, in Denver, Colorado.

White was president of Alma White College from 1921 to 1971. He became president of Belleview College and then director of the Alma Bible College in London. He also headed the Pillar of Fire missions in Liberia. He wrote at least seven books. His wife died on April 1, 1973, and he remarried.

He died on September 16, 1981, at his home in Zarephath, New Jersey.

== Publications ==
- Pillar of Fire Praises (1910) with Alma White and Lillian O. Bridwell
- The Harp of Gold (1911) with Alma White
- A Toppling Idol - evolution (1933)
- The Boys Made Good and Other Sermons (1936) reprinted in 1952
- Cross & Crown Hymnal: Pillar of Fire Church (1943)
- Introduction to Guardians of Liberty: Volumes Two and Three (1943)
- Some White Family History (1948)
- Protestant Ideals (1951)
- Your Alabaster Box and Other Sermons (1961)
- Crusading Christian Women (1963)

== Quotes ==
From his introduction to Guardians of Liberty, Vol. II, 1943 by Bishop Alma White:

Adolf Hitler in Mein Kampf, so vicious and Machiavellian in character, plainly told a stupid world what he intended to do, and Rome, through her many pronouncements, encyclical letters, and preachments, has declared in unmistakable terms her prerogatives, boasting the right to rule over the souls of men, not only in the church, but in the state.

Mother quotes again and again from the authenticated Roman Catholic sources. She feels her mission is to inform a Liberty-loving people of hierarchical purposes and ambition. Totalitarianism never originated with an Austrian peasant; it is centuries old. The most foolish thing that we can do is to take liberty for granted. Just as the human body must constantly contend with disease germs from the cradle to the grave, so liberty must wage a constant, everlasting battle against the foes that would destroy it.

If the author is plain-spoken, if she goes direct to the point, if she does not hedge, anyone who reads these lectures, who takes the time to study the authorities quoted, will most certainly be convinced that she has ample reasons to call a spade a spade, for the reasons have arisen, not through prejudice or bigotry, but from Rome’s own official statements and established dogmas.

We cannot afford to sleep. Our safety lies in keeping informed and in eternal vigilance. Every truth-loving citizen should take the time and trouble to learn the facts and pledge himself to be an un-swerving, uncompromising, untiring, 100-per cent Protestant, and a faithful “Guardian of Liberty.”

"Guardian of Liberty" was a euphemism for a member of the Ku Klux Klan.

From The Good Citizen 1923. Bishop White uses what he calls the “privilege” of slavery to help illustrate his argument that when some liberties are granted, other liberties are often lost:

At one time in our national history the holding of slaves was permissible under the laws. The abuse of this privilege began seriously to menace the peace of the entire country. Though many plausible arguments were presented by a minority on the subject of personal liberty for our white citizenry, and Biblical ones, even, for the continuance of the old regime, slavery was nevertheless abolished.

Preceded by Alma Bridwell White	Superintendent of Pillar of Fire Church; 1946-1981	Succeeded by Arlene White Lawrence
Preceded by Ray Bridwell White	President of Belleview College -	Succeeded by -
Preceded by N/A	President of Alma White College; 1921-1971	Succeeded by -
