= Dallenbach =

Dallenbach is a surname. Notable people with the surname include:

- Wally Dallenbach Jr. (born 1963), American NASCAR driver and commentator, son of Wally Dallenbach Sr.
- Wally Dallenbach Sr. (born 1936), American Indy car driver
- Robert Barney Dallenbach (born 1927), American bishop of the Pillar of Fire Church
