= Heroes of the Fiery Cross =

1928 nonfiction book by white supremacist Alma Bridwell White

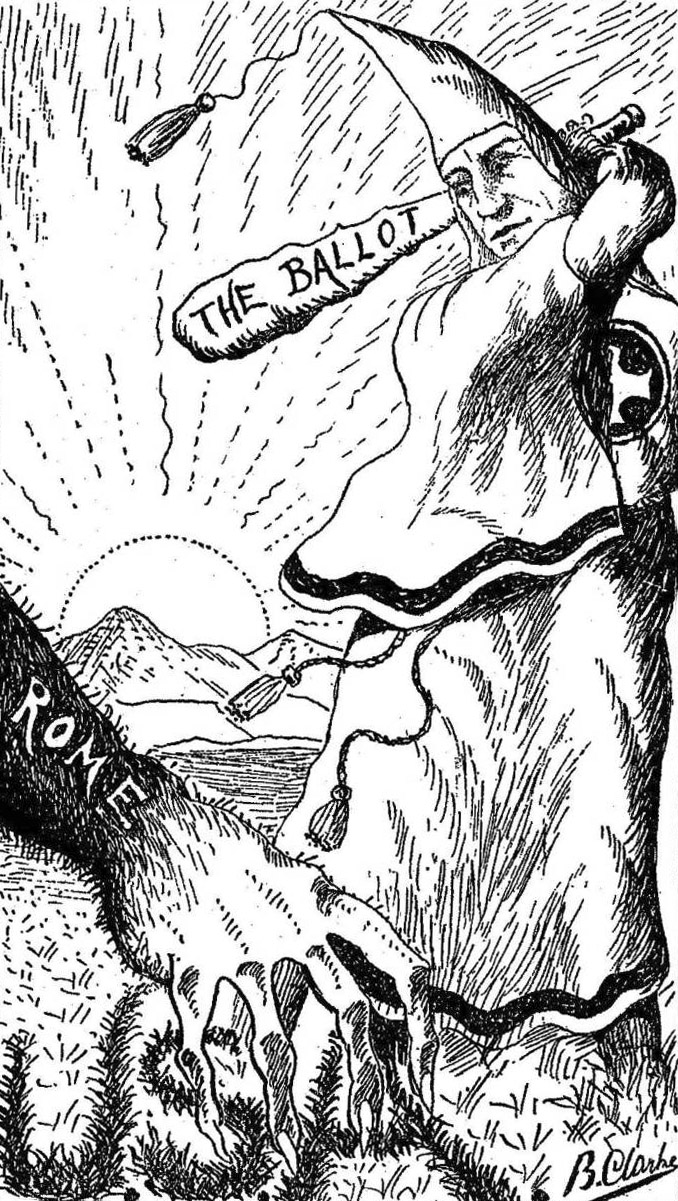
- Branford Clarke's illustration portraying the Klan's political efforts to crush Catholic influence
- Author: Alma Bridwell White
- Illustrator: Branford Clarke
- Subjects: Anti-Catholicism, antisemitism, nativism and white supremacy
- Publisher: Pillar of Fire Church
- Publication date: 1928
- Pages: 200
- Preceded by: Klansmen: Guardians of Liberty (1926)
- Followed by: Hymns and Poems (1931)

Forward from KKK Imperial Wizard Dr. Hiram Wesley Evans

Heroes of the Fiery Cross is a book published in 1928 by Protestant Bishop Alma Bridwell White, in which she praises and portrays the Ku Klux Klan as a heroic force while "sounding the alarm about imagined threats to Protestant Americans from Catholics and Jews", according to author Peter Knight. In the book she asks rhetorically, "Who are the enemies of the Klan? They are the bootleggers, law-breakers, corrupt politicians, weak-kneed Protestant church members, white slavers, toe-kissers, wafer-worshippers, and every spineless character who takes the path of least resistance." White frequently uses the Klan's racist and anti-Catholic talking points, such as arguing for the idea that Catholics were attempting to remove the Bible from public schools. Another topic is her stance towards the United States presidential election of 1928, in which Al Smith, a Catholic, was running for president.

== History ==
White was the author of more than 35 books published by the Pillar of Fire Church. In her writings and sermons her political views consisted of a mixture of women's equality, anti-catholicism, antisemitism, racism, nativism and white supremacy. The book is a compendium of essays written by White and of illustrations by Reverend Branford Clarke that were originally published in the pro-Ku Klux Klan political periodical The Good Citizen, one of the numerous periodicals published by the Pillar of Fire Church at their communal headquarters in Zarephath, New Jersey.

The book contains an introductory letter of commendation from Hiram Wesley Evans, the then Imperial Wizard of the Ku Klux Klan. Heroes is the final work in a series of three books White published to promote the Klan. The other books were The Ku Klux Klan in Prophecy in 1925, and Klansmen: Guardians of Liberty, in 1926. White republished her Klan books as a three-volume set in 1943, three years before her death and 21 years after her initial association with the Klan, under the title Guardians of Liberty.

The book include essays with titles such as Roman Catholic-Hebrew Alliance; Mussolini, Rome, and Reds; and Immigration and White Supremacy.

== White supremacy ==
Alma White emphatically expresses her sympathy for former slaveowners since they were not compensated for their loss of "property" following the American Civil War. She expresses her fear and distress toward ongoing racial mixing and uses biblical citations as divine justification for white supremacy.

The slave-holder, in many instances, was as much to be pitied as the slaves, but the Northerners could not see this. He (the slave-holder), too, was a victim of the system, often having inherited slaves along with his plantation. Where the slaves were well treated they were happy and contented, and their owners found consolation in this, using it as an argument in support of the institution. But some radicals could never see this side of the question. They dwelt continually on the cruelties of a few hard taskmasters and ignored the good people who had the welfare of their dependents at heart. It was hard for the Southerners to be reconciled to this spirit so widely manifested in the North. No matter what the better class of slave-owners might do, they had to bear the stigma and cruelty with the worst of tyrants. ...

A strong attachment as a rule existed between the negro servants and their masters which could not be easily broken. When it came time to taking away a colored "Mammy" who had brought up the children of her white master, even nursing them at her own breast in an extremity, here was more involved than a Northerner could readily comprehend. This aspect of slavery was never taken into serious consideration by hot-headed Abolitionists who tried to foment war and bring about disunion. ...

White supremacy is an issue of great importance. If some of the colored people are not curbed in their ambition to mix their blood with that of the white race, it will not be long until there will be no such thing as definite racial lines. The Negroes are going north and settling indiscriminately among the whites. Property values are being depreciated by this influx of colored immigration. But little sympathy was shown the South when a race of colored slaves was liberated among them. The North had no conception of what it meant for the white people of the South to preserve the color and racial lines, considering the fact that in some places the population was about equally divided, and there was no cooperation from the North to be had in the struggle. ...

The Book of Genesis, in its account of Shem, Ham, and Japheth, sons of Noah, teaches the supremacy of the white race. Ham saw the nakedness of his father, but made no effort to cover him, and a curse was pronounced upon him and his posterity. Noah awoke from his wine and said, "Cursed be Canaan [Ham]; a servant of servants shall he be unto his brethren." "Blessed be the Lord of God of Shem; and Canaan shall be his servant." "God shall enlarge Japheth [the white race], and he shall dwell in the tents of Shem; and Canaan shall be his servant" (Gen. 9:25-27). This edict was imposed by a wise and just God, and should not work a hardship on the black race. It cannot be otherwise than it should be for their good. Until the curse is lifted from the human race, the very best position that the sons of Ham could be placed in is that of servants (not slaves), thus establishing white supremacy as foretold more than four thousand years ago. ...
