= Ray Bridwell White =

American church minister (1892–1946)

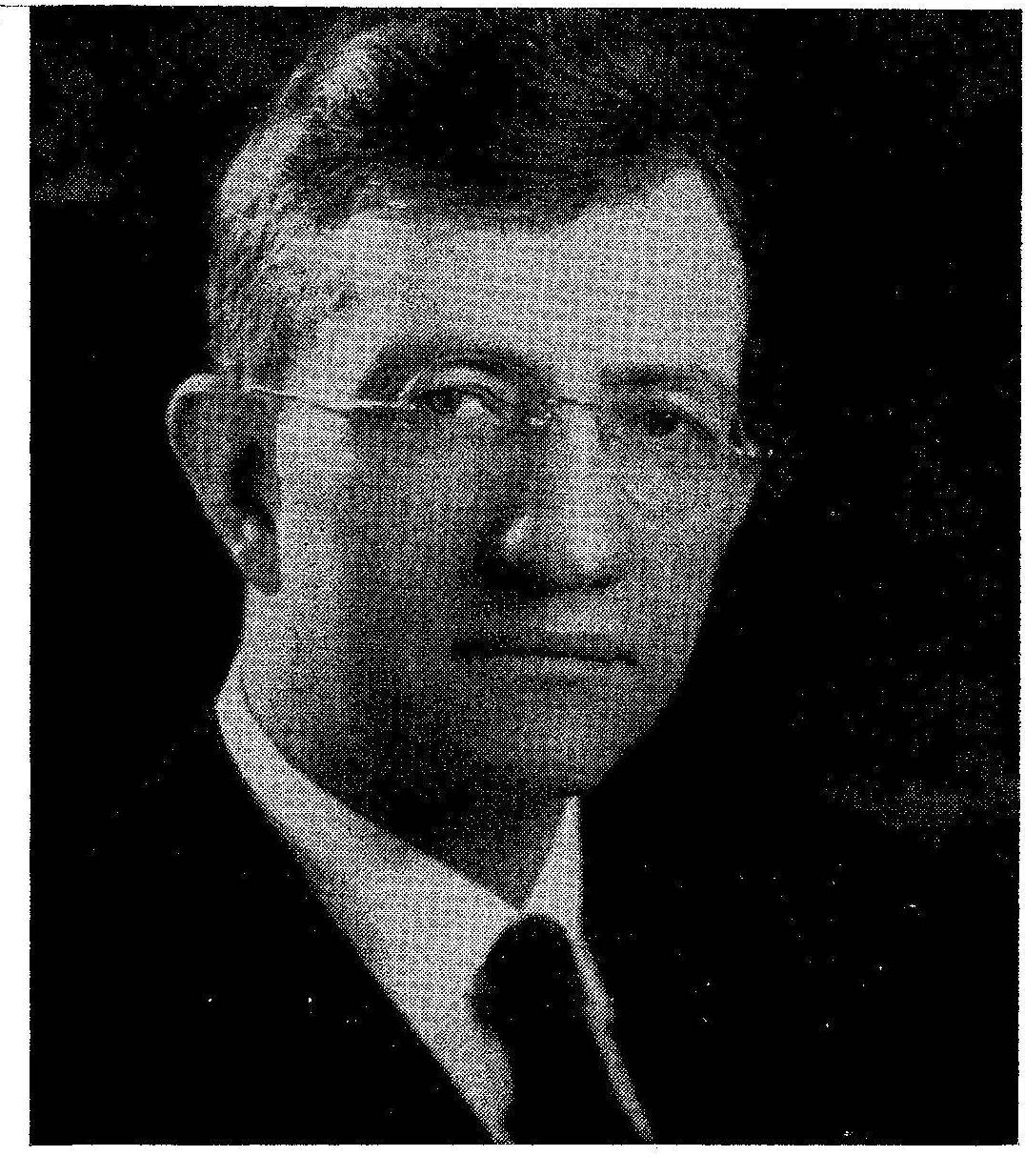
- White circa 1940-1945
- Born: August 24, 1892; Denver, Colorado
- Died: November 5, 1946 (aged 54); Zarephath, New Jersey
- Resting place: Fairmount Cemetery
- Education: Columbia University (A.B., 1917)
- Occupation: Pillar of Fire Church
- Spouse: Grace E. Miller
- Parent(s): Alma Bridwell White; Kent White (1860-1940)
- Relatives: Arthur Kent White, brother

Ray Bridwell White (August 24, 1892 – November 5, 1946) was the son of Alma White, the leader of the Pillar of Fire Church in Zarephath, New Jersey. He was nominated to be a Bishop shortly after his mother died in 1946, but was too ill to attend the ordination ceremony and died shortly thereafter.

== Biography ==
White was born on August 24, 1892, in Denver, Colorado, to Alma Bridwell (1862-1946) and Kent White (1860-1940). He had a brother, Arthur Kent White (1889-1981).

The church was started by his mother, Alma Bridwell White, in Denver. He attended Columbia University and graduated in 1917. Alma White died on June 26, 1946.

Ray died on November 5, 1946, in Zarephath, New Jersey, and was buried in Fairmount Cemetery in Denver.

== Publications ==
- The false Christ of communism and the social gospel: an answer to the Dean of Canterbury who says Russian communism is Christianity in practice. Zarephath, NJ: Pillar of Fire. 1946. ISBN 1-4191-3000-5.
- The Truth in Satire Concerning Infallible Popes, The Good Citizen, 1929.
- "Eternal security" insecure: Or the heresy of "once in grace always in grace".
- The legend of Manitousa and other poems, Hank and other sketches.
- Doctrines and discipline of the Pillar of Fire Church. (1918) revised 1923, 1926
