= Pacific Bay Christian School =

Coordinates: 37.58619°N 122.49282°W

- 1030 Linda Mar Blvd. Pacifica, California 94044; United States

Information
- Type: Private
- Motto: "Faith, Knowledge, Virtue"
- Religious affiliations: Ecumenical, formerly Pillar of Fire International
- Established: 2018
- NCES School ID: 00092477
- Head of school: Michael Chen, Ed.D.
- Grades: Kindergarten-12
- Enrollment: 285
- Campus: Suburban
- Colors: Blue and yellow
- Athletics conference: PSAL
- Sports: Basketball, baseball, volleyball, soccer, softball, cross country
- Mascot: Eagle
- Website: http://www.pacbay.org

Pacific Bay Christian School, formerly Alma Heights Christian Academy, is a private Christian middle and high school in Pacifica, California, United States. It was founded by Pillar of Fire International as a segregation academy. In 2018, the school disassociated with Pillar of Fire and reopened as Pacific Bay Christian School.

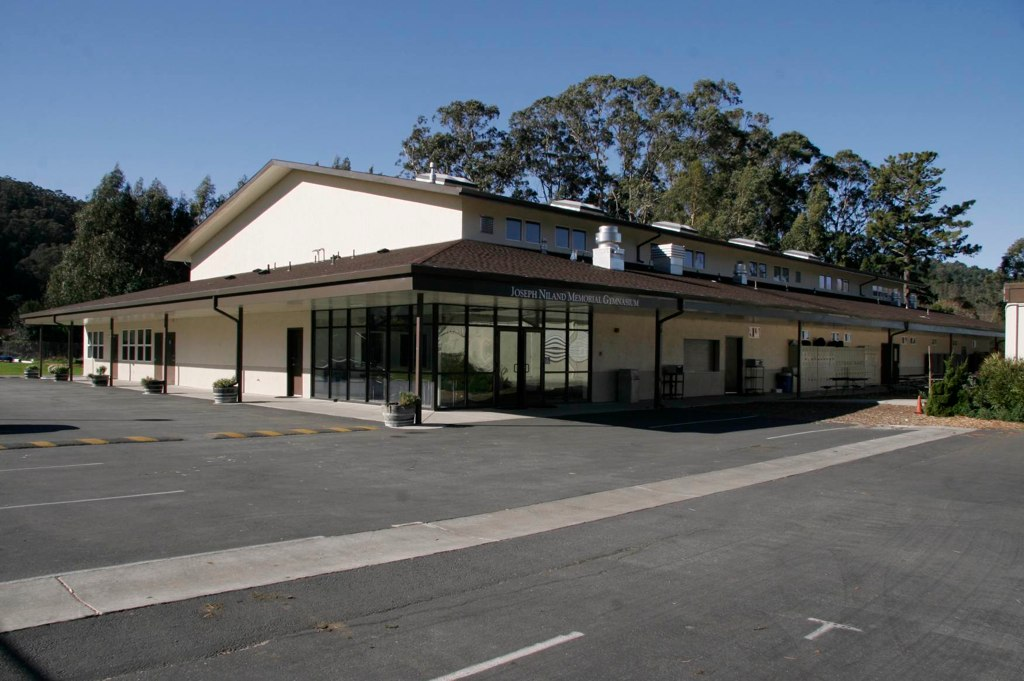
Joseph Niland Memorial Gymnasium

== History ==
In 1955 the Pillar of Fire International, a Methodist sect known for their support of the Ku Klux Klan, racism, and xenophobia, founded the school in response to the 1954 Supreme Court decision Brown v. Board of Education, which ruled that segregated public schools were unconstitutional. The school was named for Alma Bridwell White, the group's founding bishop. In 2017, in the face of declining enrollment, the school agreed to change its name and turn to overtly anti-racist policies. It reopened as Pacific Bay Christian School in 2018. As of 2018, there were 285 students in grades K-12.

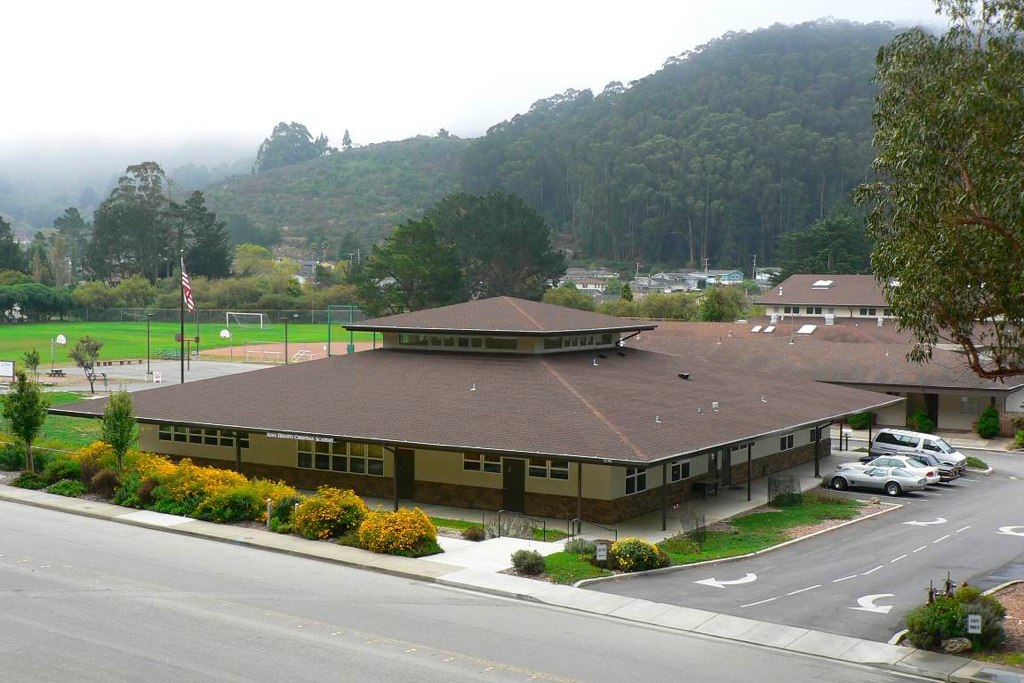
Science wing and school Community Center

== Demographics ==
According to NCES, as of the 2018 school year, the school reported a population of 285 students, which included 199 or 69.8% White, 64 or 22.5% Asian, 13 or 4.6% Hispanic, 7 or 2.5% Black, and 2 or .7% Native Hawaiian or Pacific Islander.
