= Godbey =

Godbey is a surname. Notable people with the surname include:

- David C. Godbey (born 1957), United States federal judge
- William Baxter Godbey (1833–1920), American evangelist

== See also ==
- Lisa Godbey Wood (born 1963), American judge
