= Guardians of Liberty =

1943 set of books by Alma Bridwell White

- Author: Alma Bridwell White
- Illustrator: Branford Clarke
- Subject: Anti-Catholicism, Ku Klux Klan, White Supremacy, Antisemitism
- Publisher: Pillar of Fire Church
- Publication date: 1943
- Pages: 139, 139, ukn.

Guardians of Liberty is a three volume set of books published in 1943 by Bishop Alma Bridwell White, author of over 35 books and founder of the Pillar of Fire Church. Guardians of Liberty is primarily devoted to summarizing White's vehement anti-Catholicism under the guise of patriotism. White also defends her historical support of and association with the Ku Klux Klan while significantly but not completely distancing herself from the Klan. Each of the three volumes corresponds to one of the three books White published in the 1920s promoting the Ku Klux Klan and her political views which in addition to anti-Catholicism also included nativism, antisemitism and white supremacy. In Guardians of Liberty, White removed most, but not all of the direct references to the Klan that had existed in her three 1920s books, both in the text and in the illustrations. In Volumes I and II, she removed most of the nativist, antisemitic and white supremacist ideology that had appeared in her predecessor books. However, in Guardians Volume III, she did retain edited versions of chapters promoting nativism, antisemitism and white supremacy.

Like their predecessor books, each of the volumes is primarily a compendium of essays and sermons written by White and of illustrations by Reverend Branford Clarke. Most of the text and illustrations had originally been published in the pro-Ku Klux Klan political periodical The Good Citizen, one of the numerous periodicals published by the Pillar of Fire Church at their communal headquarters in Zarephath, New Jersey. The Pillar of Fire ceased publication of The Good Citizen in 1933. Guardians was published when White was 81 years old, three years before her death, and one year before the second Ku Klux Klan declared bankruptcy.

== Volume I ==
Volume one of Guardians of Liberty was an edited reprint of White's 1925 book The Ku Klux Klan in Prophecy. Of the 13 chapters in Guardians Vol. I, 7 are edited chapters from KKK in Prophecy, and one chapter is from Heroes of the Fiery Cross (1928).

An additional chapter, Rome’s Political Defeat defends the Pillar of Fire Church and its members' role in two violent incidents that occurred near Zarephath, New Jersey, the church's headquarters.

It is devoted nearly entirely to promoting White's deeply held fears and hatred of the Roman Catholic Church and of Roman Catholic individuals. Most of the material promoting anti-Semitism, racism, and white supremacy that had originally been published in KKK in Prophecy was omitted in Guardians Vol. I, although some more-subtle reference were still included. Furthermore, most but not all of the references to the Ku Klux Klan were either removed or substituted with the following euphemisms: Patriots, Patriots in White Robes, Our Patriots, Our American Patriots, 100-Per Cent Americans, A Great Patriotic Organization, Invisible Empire, Freedom, Liberty, The Star of Hope, and Our Guardians of Liberty. Two illustrations with Klan images were retained and included in Guardians Vol. 1.

== Volume II ==
Volume two of Guardians of Liberty contains fifteen chapters, thirteen are from Klansmen: Guardians of Liberty and one from The Ku Klux Klan in Prophecy.

== See also ==
- The Ku Klux Klan in Prophecy
- Klansmen: Guardians of Liberty
- Heroes of the Fiery Cross
- The Good Citizen
- History of Ku Klux Klan in New Jersey
