= Pillar of Fire International =

Methodist sect

- Orientation: Methodist
- Theology: Wesleyan-Arminian
- General superintendent: Joseph Gross
- Headquarters: Zarephath, New Jersey, U.S.
- Founder: Alma Bridwell White
- Origin: 1901; 125 years ago Denver, Colorado, U.S.
- Branched from: Methodist Episcopal Church
- Places of worship: 76
- Hospitals: Zarephath Health Center
- Primary schools: Alma Heights Christian Schools, Belleview Christian School, Eden Grove Academy, Sycamore Grove School
- Tax status: 501(c)(3)
- Tertiary institutions: Belleview College, Pillar College
- Official website: www.pillar.org

The Pillar of Fire International, also known as the Pillar of Fire Church, is a Methodist Christian denomination with headquarters in Zarephath, New Jersey. The Pillar of Fire Church affirms the Methodist Articles of Religion and as of 1988, had 76 congregations around the world, including the United States, as well as "Great Britain, India, Liberia, Malawi, Nigeria, the Philippines, Spain, and former Yugoslavia".

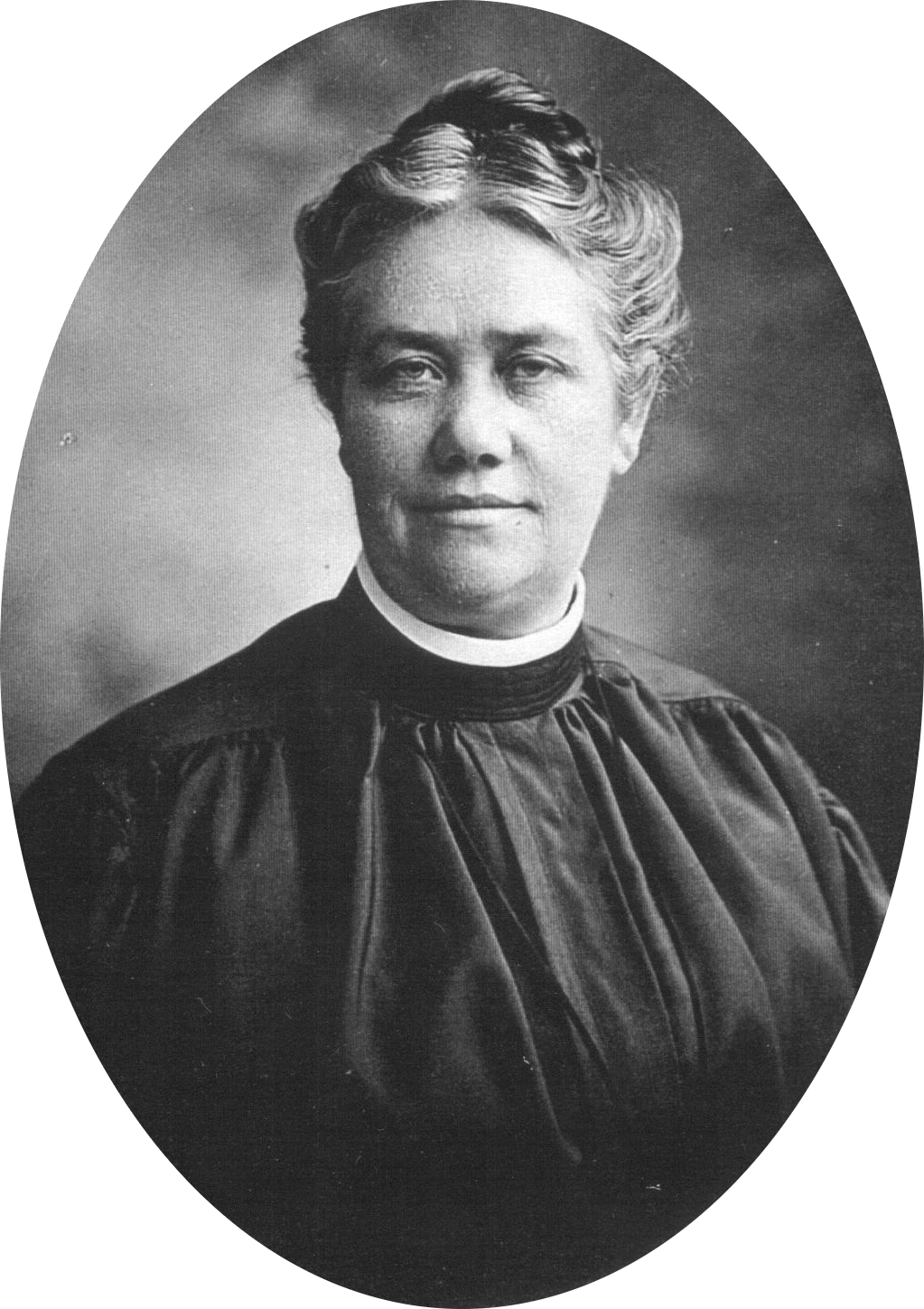
Bishop Alma Bridwell White (1862–1946), founder of the Pillar of Fire Church

The denomination runs radio stations, a printing press, and educational institutions including a seminary.

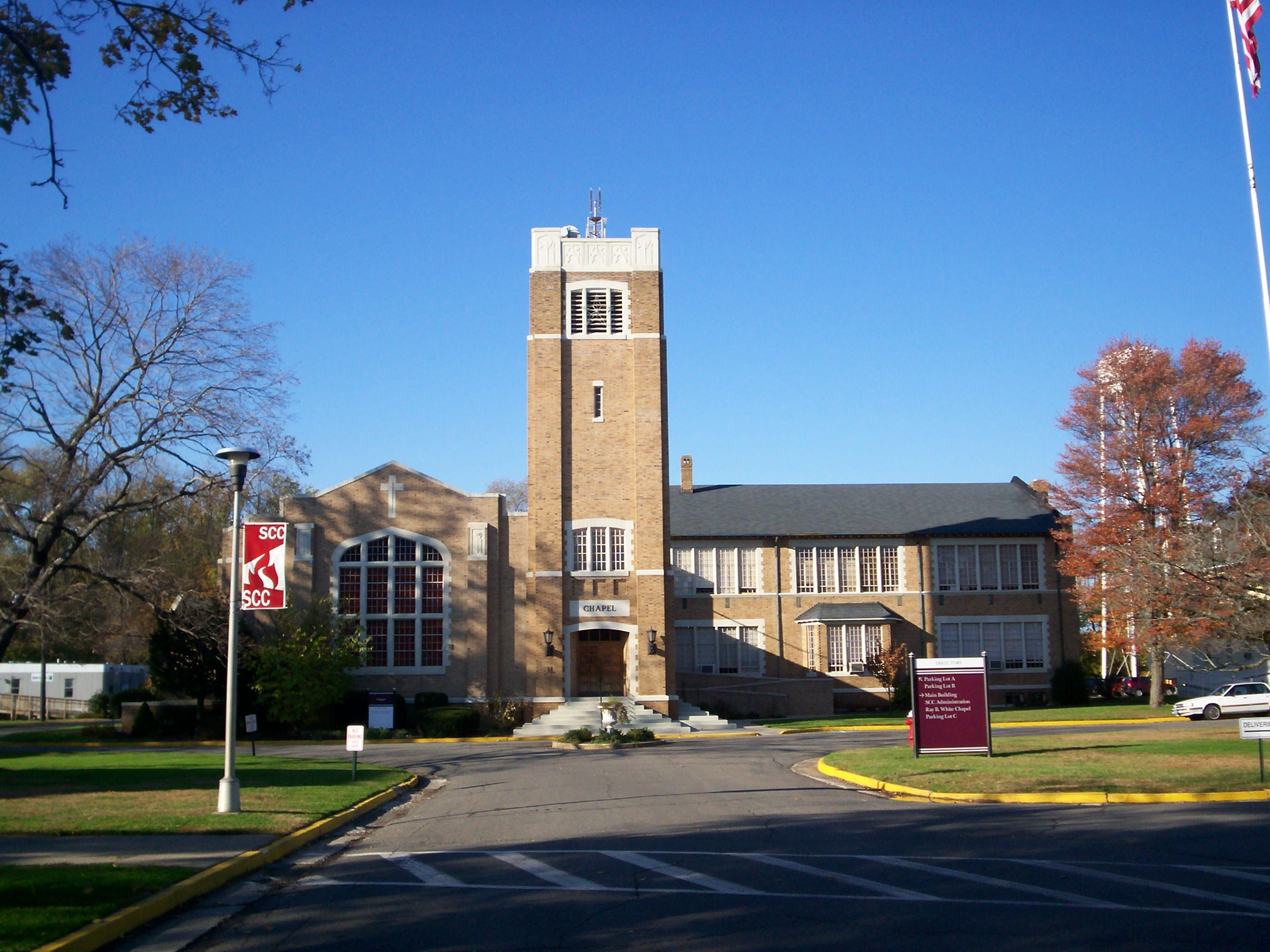
Zarephath Christian Church in Zarephath, New Jersey

In the early 20th century, Pillar of Fire was known for its support for women's rights; in the same century, it was known for supporting the Ku Klux Klan and its racist platform. In 1997 and 2009, Pillar of Fire repudiated the denomination's former association with racism and requested forgiveness from God for formerly holding this position. In the present day, worshippers at the mother church in Zarephath are "young, old, white, black, Asian, Hispanic".

Pillar of Fire missionaries, November 25, 1914

Assembly Hall service c. 1965 in Zarephath, New Jersey

Missionary homes of the Pillar of Fire Church in 1966

== History ==
=== Founding ===
In 1901, the Church was founded as a Methodist denomination by Alma Bridwell White in Denver, Colorado. The Pillar of Fire was originally incorporated as the Pentecostal Union, but changed its name to distance itself from Pentecostalism in 1915. While the Pillar of Fire is Methodist in doctrine, Alma White and her followers believed that the mainline Methodist Church had become corrupt. Alma White and the members of the Pillar of Fire dedicated themselves to the holiness movement in the Wesleyan tradition. Adherents were referred to as "Holy Rollers" and "holy jumpers" because of their religious excitement. White was noted for her association with the Ku Klux Klan, her feminism, anti-Catholicism, antisemitism, anti-pentecostalism, racism, and nativism. With its founder being the first woman bishop in the United States, the Pillar of Fire is a supporter of women's rights, printing the periodical Women's Chains to propagate support for the movement until 1970.

=== Support for Ku Klux Klan and repudiation ===
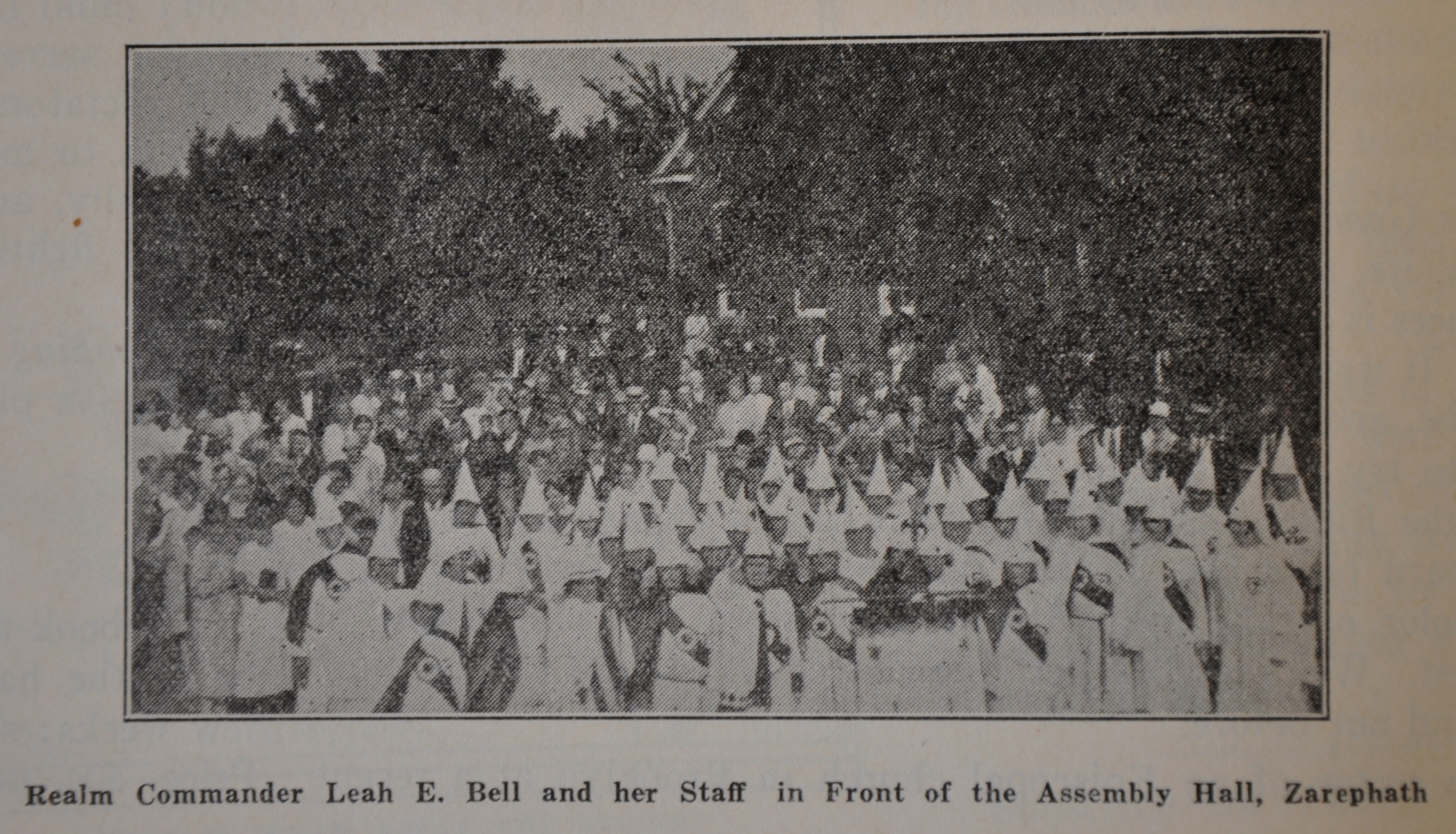
Klanswomen gather on August 31, 1929 in front of Assembly Hall, Zarephath, New Jersey, for "Patriotic Day" during annual Camp Meeting.

In the 1920s, 1930s, and 1940s, the Pillar of Fire Church was vocal in its support of the Ku Klux Klan, to an extent which was unique for a religious denomination. Alma White prolifically spoke and wrote of both her and the Pillar of Fire Church's support of the Klan and many of the Klan's principles including anti-Catholicism, white supremacy, antisemitism, nativism, and temperance. In 1943, shortly before her death, she and the Pillar of Fire Church significantly but not completely distanced themselves from the then discredited and nearly bankrupt Klan organization, but they still continued to promote many of the Klan's intolerant principles. In a 1920s sermon which she republished in 1943, she said

We have no connection with the Klan organization. We endorse them in the principles for which they stand. However there is no room in our hearts for racial prejudice.

However, White and the Pillar of Fire still advocated white supremacy in the same 1943 book-set which asserted their distaste for racial prejudice. In her chapter which was titled "White Supremacy" she wrote

The slaveholder, in many instances, was as much to be pitied as the slaves. He, too, was a victim of the system. ... Where the slaves were well treated they were happy and contented ... But some radicals could never see this side of the question. They dwelt continually on the cruelties of a few hard taskmasters and ignored the good people who had the welfare of their dependents at heart. No matter what the better class of slave owners might do, they had to bear the stigma of cruelty with the worst of tyrants. ... Where property rights are involved, supported by the government, the only safe and sane way to make wrongs right is by cool-headed procedure.

She also said to the New Brunswick Daily Home News,

"My people are not members of the Klan, but we agree with some of the things that they stand for to assert our American right of free speech. We have always stood for one hundred percent Americanism and so does the Klan, so naturally we agree there."

Additionally, the Pillar of Fire's pulpit and its printing operation were both extensively used to advocate many of the Klan's most intolerant values. In 1922, Bishop Alma White promoted the Klan in a sermon which she preached at the Pillar of Fire Church in Brooklyn, New York (which was coincidentally incinerated in the 1960 New York air disaster) and published that sermon in The Good Citizen. The speech was titled "Ku Klux Klan and Woman's Causes" and one section was subtitled "White Supremacy".

The Klansmen stand for the supremacy of the white race, which is perfectly legitimate and in accordance with the teachings of the Holy Writ, and anything that has been decreed by the Almighty should not work a hardship on the colored race ... It is within the rights of civilization for the white race to hold the supremacy; and no injustice to the colored man to stay in the environment where he was placed by the Creator. ... When the black man was liberated it was time for women to be enfranchised, without which the colored man with his newly-acquired rank became her political master. ... The white women bore the sting of humiliation for more than half a century in being placed in an inferior position to the black men in the use of the ballot and the rights of citizenship ... To whom shall we look to champion the cause and to protect the rights of women? Is there not evidence that the Knights of the Klu [sic] Klux Klan are the prophets of a new and better age?

The Pillar of Fire Church strongly argued against social and political equality for Blacks and it also advocated racial segregation and the repeal of the fifteenth amendment. The Pillar allowed the Klan to hold meetings or cross burnings on at least several of the church's numerous properties including numerous documented Klan gatherings in Zarephath, New Jersey; Brooklyn, New York; Bound Brook, New Jersey; Longmont, Colorado; and Westminster, Colorado. White participated directly in many of these meetings. During this time, the Pillar of Fire Church published The Good Citizen, a monthly 16 page political magazine and three books, The Ku Klux Klan in Prophecy, Klansmen: Guardians of Liberty, and Heroes of the Fiery Cross, all of which heavily promoted the Klan and its agenda from 1921 until 1933. Ideologically, in these publications, the Pillar of Fire Church promoted anti-Catholicism, antisemitism, nativism, and white supremacy, all primarily under the guise of patriotism.

The radical belief in human equality which is at the heart of the Christian message eventually caused the organization to repudiate its historical relationship with the KKK on its website in 2009:

Much talk has also arisen over her brief but significant association with the KKK, which has also been publicly condemned and repented of by the POF leadership with a request for full forgiveness. Despite these and other errors in its history, the Lord in His grace and mercy has chosen to bless the ministry.

And in its local paper in 1997:

We regret, repudiate and repent, and ask for full forgiveness for anything in our past that is short of Christian standards based on God's Word, following Jesus' model prayer that teaches us to ever pray and forgive us our sins for we also forgive everyone that is indebted to us. (Luke 11:4) We specifically regret mistakes and bad judgement by previous generations or anyone in our membership of the past.

While the Pillar of Fire's repudiation of its association with the Klan characterized it as "brief," it continued to promote the Klan's ideologies of intolerance for religious and racial minorities along with the Klan's belief in the equality of all white Protestant women for several decades. In 1943, 22 years after the church started to publicly work with the Klan, it republished Alma White's pro-KKK books as a three-volume set under the title Guardians of Liberty, reaffirming its positions in support of anti-Semitism, white supremacy, nativism and most notably, anti-Catholicism. Volumes II and III of Guardians contained introductions by Arthur White, affirming his support of his mother's intolerant ideologies, primarily but not exclusively in regard to anti-Catholicism. After his mother died in 1946, he was the Pillar of Fire's general superintendent until 1981.

Robert Saydee, the presiding elder of a Pillar of Fire congregation and an immigrant from the African nation of Liberia, stated in 2017 with respect to the denomination's former association with the Ku Klux Klan that "We are not proud of it at all. But it happened in history, and things happen to people, and the organization changed tremendously after that, and we never looked back" and with regard to Bishop Alma White, the Liberian American presbyter stated: "There is no reason to discuss her. We know she is the founder, but there is no discussion or preaching about her. No, we don't do that." In the same vein, Richard Flory, senior director of research and evaluation at the University of Southern California, stated that the Pillar of Fire Church had essentially been "jettisoning their history in favor of looking like essentially everybody else." In 2017, The New York Times stated that members "don't know about the church's history" and that "leaders [of the Pillar of Fire Church] have issued statements denouncing and regretting the church's historic involvement" with the KKK.

=== 1950s–present ===
Following the death of the founder, under the leadership of her son, Arthur Kent White, the religious fervor declined and the emphasis on outreach evangelization and church planting ended; the organization branches in America fell from a high of around 52 to the current six. The Pillar of Fire, as of 1988, had churches in the United States, as well as "Great Britain, India, Liberia, Malawi, Nigeria, the Philippines, Spain, and former Yugoslavia". In the United States, the Pillar of Fire has branches in Zarephath, New Jersey; Denver, Colorado; Westminster, Colorado; Cincinnati, Ohio, Los Angeles, California; and Pacifica, California.

It primarily operates four ministry focuses, namely local church, radio, education, and missions. Its radio stations have contemporary Christian music, Christian gospel music and Christian hip hop music.

In the present-day, as of 2017, worshippers at the Pillar of Fire mother church in Zarephath are "young, old, white, black, Asian, Hispanic".

== Name ==
The name of Pillar of Fire comes from Exodus 13:21–22, which states: "By day the Lord went ahead of them in a pillar of cloud to guide them on their way and by night in a pillar of fire to give them light, so that they could travel by day or night. Neither the pillar of cloud by day nor the pillar of fire by night left its place in front of the people."

== Beliefs ==
The organization's doctrinal position is self-described as Wesleyan-Arminian theology in common with other Methodist denominations. The central beliefs of the Pillar of Fire are as follows: biblical inerrancy, Trinitarianism, the physical resurrection of Jesus, the consubstantiality of the Holy Spirit, the "universal depravity of the human race", the necessity of "repentance toward God, and faith toward our Lord Jesus Christ", belief in "justification by faith and in Christian perfection, or entire sanctification, as a second definite work of grace", the immortality of the soul, the resurrection of the dead, and premillennialism.

== Continued work of the Pillar of Fire ==
The Pillar of Fire continues its work today working in three main areas: radio, education, and missions, both local and overseas.

=== United States congregations ===
- Alma Temple, Denver
- Belleview Community Chapel, Westminster, Colorado
- Coastside Community Church, Pacifica, California
- City Church Cincinnati, Cincinnati
- Pillar of Fire Church, Los Angeles
- Zarephath Christian Church, Zarephath, New Jersey

=== Zarephath Health Center ===
The Zarephath Health Center was opened in 2003 and utilizes volunteer physicians, nurses and support people to meet the health care needs of the poor and uninsured on the campus at Zarephath, New Jersey. The Health Center sees 300–400 patients per month who otherwise would not be able to obtain affordable health care. Dr. Eck testified to the Joint Economic Committee on Health Insurance on April 28, 2004, to demonstrate the sustainability of this model.

=== International missions ===
There are missions in India, Costa Rica and Liberia as well as:

- The oldest of their missions was in Hendon London, England, and was established in 1904 by Alma White. The mission organized a Charitable Trust on 19 September 1992, and was registered as a charity in December 1992 (Charity No. 1015529). In response to a complaint received by the Charity Commission in 2002, an inquiry was held, the charitable trust dissolved and transferred its assets to the U.S. organization, and the charitable trust was removed from the registry as it had ceased to exist. One of the stated aims of this mission was to evangelize the local Jewish population in the vicinity of the mission. Ironically, after the mission was sold, the property became a kosher boutique hotel in 2010.
- Reverend Smallridge was given permission to start a Pillar of Fire Church in Nigeria in 1974.
- The Pillar of Fire was established in Malawi in 1984 by Reverend Moses Peter K. Phiri.

== Schools ==
=== Primary and secondary ===
- Alma Heights Christian Schools in Pacifica, California
- Belleview Christian School in Westminster, Colorado
- Eden Grove Academy in Cincinnati
- Sycamore Grove School in Los Angeles

=== Colleges ===
- Alma White College in Zarephath, New Jersey (1917–1978)
- Belleview College in Westminster, Colorado
- Somerset Christian College, now known as Pillar College and has campuses in Newark and Paterson, NJ and looking to span across the state. Pillar College is no longer associated with the Pillar of Fire

== Pillar Media ==
Pillar Media is the parent organization for several media outlets geared toward Christians.

=== Radio stations ===
- KPOF, KFCO and KSRC in Denver, Colorado
- WAWZ in Zarephath, New Jersey
- WAKW in Cincinnati

=== Discontinued periodicals ===
- Pillar of Fire
- Pillar Magazine
- The Dry Legion
- The Good Citizen
- Rocky Mountain Pillar of Fire
- London Pillar of Fire
- The British Sentinel
- The Occidental Pillar of Fire
- Woman's Chains
- Pillar of Fire Junior
- Pillar of Fire Bay Chronicle
- The Alma White Evangel

== Notable members ==
=== General superintendents ===
- Alma Bridwell White (1862–1946), the founder and first general superintendent from 1901 to 1946.
- Arthur Kent White (1889–1981), son of the founder, second general superintendent from 1946 to 1981.
- Arlene Hart Lawrence (1916–1990), granddaughter of the founder, 1981 to 1984, third general superintendent.
- Donald Justin Wolfram (1919–2003), great-nephew of the founder, 1984 to 2000, fourth general superintendent.
- Robert Barney Dallenbach (1927–2025), husband of granddaughter of the founder, 2000 to 2008, fifth general superintendent.
- Joseph Gross, 2008 to present, sixth general superintendent.

=== Other leaders and notable members ===
- Reverend Robert K. Cruver, Jr.
- Reverend Stephan P. Nash
- Bishop William Cruver
- Reverend Branford Clarke
- Reverend Pauline White Dallenbach
- Reverend Thomas A. Goode, he sued the church in 1920 saying the church "had alienated the affections of his wife and defrauded him of his property"
- Bishop Wilber Konkel
- Bishop E. Jerry Lawrence
- Bishop A. R. Stewart
- Reverend Johannes Maas, ordained by Bishop Arthur White in 1956, international president, Worldwide Faith Missions
- Reverend Kathleen Merrell White
- Reverend Gertrude Metlen Wolfram (1888–1959) was the dean of Alma White College

== Timeline ==
- 1862 Birth of Alma White as "Mollie Alma Bridwell" in Kinniconick, Kentucky
- 1887 Marriage of Alma Bridwell to Kent White
- 1896 Church established in Denver
- 1901 Methodist Pentecostal Union Church dedicated in Denver in December
- 1902 Alma White ordained an elder
- 1904 Pentecostal Union Herald changed to Pillar of Fire
- c. 1905 Pillar of Fire separates from Methodist Episcopal Church
- 1907 Creation of community at Zarephath, New Jersey
- 1909 Alma White separates from husband after he converts to Pentecostalism
- 1913 Begins publishing The Good Citizen, which is in print until 1933
- 1915 Publishes "Why I do not eat meat"
- 1917 Name of church officially changed to "Pillar of Fire"
- 1917 Alma White College founded in Zarephath, New Jersey
- 1918 White becomes the first woman ordained as a bishop in the United States by William Godbey
- 1920 Acquires Westminster University of Colorado property in Westminster, Colorado
- 1924 Publishes Woman's Chains, which is in print until 1970
- 1925 Westminster University renamed Belleview College and Preparatory School
- 1925 Publishes The Ku Klux Klan in Prophecy
- 1926 Publishes Klansmen: Guardians of Liberty
- 1928 Publishes Heroes of the Fiery Cross
- 1928 KPOF radio station in Westminster, Colorado
- 1931 WAWZ radio station in Zarephath, New Jersey
- 1932 Church established in Morrison, Colorado
- 1936 Property estimated at $US 4M with 4,000 adherents in 46 congregations
- 1943 Republishes Guardians of Liberty as a three volume set
- 1946 Death of Alma White on June 26
- 1946 Death of Ray Bridwell White on November 5
- 1946 Arthur Kent White begins tenure as second general superintendent
- 1978 Alma White College closes
- 1981 Arthur Kent White ends tenure
- 1981 Arlene White begins tenure as third general superintendent
- 1984 Arlene White ends tenure
- 1985 Donald Justin Wolfram begins tenure as fourth general superintendent
- 2000 Donald Justin Wolfram ends tenure
- 2000 Robert B. Dallenbach begins tenure as fifth general superintendent
- 2003 Donald Justin Wolfram dies on August 25
- 2008 Robert B. Dallenbach loses vote of confidence at 2008 camp meeting. Vice Superintendent Joseph Gross becomes sixth general superintendent.
- 2009 Somerset Christian Academy, formerly Alma Preparatory School, closes

== See also ==
- List of Methodist denominations
- Ku Klux Klan in New Jersey
