= Pillar College =

Private Christian college in Newark, New Jersey, U.S.

- Pillar College's seal
- Motto: Truth in education
- Type: Private college
- Established: 1908
- Chairman: Timothy L. Schmidt
- President: David E. Schroeder
- Location: Newark, Paterson, and Jersey City, New Jersey, U.S. 40.738424°N 74.169461°W
- Campus: Urban Center
- Colors: Red, black, white
- Mascot: Panther
- Website: www.pillar.edu

Pillar College (formerly Somerset Christian College) is a private evangelical Christian college with its main campus in Newark, New Jersey and additional educational locations in Paterson and Jersey City. Pillar College is accredited by the Middle States Commission on Higher Education.

== History ==
The school was founded as a Wesleyan-Arminian Methodist seminary, the Zarephath Bible Institute in Zarephath, New Jersey, by the Pillar of Fire International in 1908.

The institute became an accredited college, the Somerset Christian College on March 23, 2001.

In 2011, the college's campus was destroyed by Hurricane Irene; the college moved to a new campus in Newark. Shortly thereafter, the college's name was changed to Pillar College as the college was no longer in Somerset County although it had separated from Pillar of Fire International.

In 2018, the college opened a second location in Paterson. The college enrolls approximately 550 students.

== Academics ==
Pillar College offers traditional and accelerated associate, bachelor's, and master's degree programs. It is accredited by the Middle States Commission on Higher Education and is a member of the Association for Biblical Higher Education.

== See also ==
- Higher education in New Jersey
