= KPOF =

- Denver, Colorado; United States
- Broadcast area: Denver-Boulder-Longmont
- Frequency: 910 kHz (HD Radio)
- Branding: AM910 KPOF

Programming
- Format: Christian talk and teaching

Ownership
- Owner: Pillar of Fire International
- Sister stations: KSRC, KFCO

History
- First air date: January 12, 1927
- Call sign meaning: Pillar of Fire

Technical information
- Licensing authority: FCC
- Facility ID: 52600
- Class: B
- Power: 5,000 watts daytime; 1,000 watts nighttime
- Translator: 102.7 K274DF (Denver)

Links
- Public license information: Public file; LMS
- Webcast: Listen Live
- Website: www.am91.org

KPOF (910 kHz) is a non-profit AM radio station in Denver, Colorado. It is owned by Pillar of Fire and airs a Christian talk and teaching radio format. The studio and transmitter are in Westminster, located on the campus of Belleview Christian Schools in the historic Westminster Castle, just northwest of Denver. KPOF uses the moniker "AM91: The Point of Faith", and is a member of the National Religious Broadcasters, noted for non-profit religious and educational programs and music. KPOF considers itself the "granddaddy" of religious broadcasters, owned by a Christian organization since 1928.

== Programming ==
KPOF carries local and national religious leaders, including David Jeremiah, Chuck Swindoll, Joni Eareckson Tada and John Daly. Late nights and some weekend hours, the station broadcasts adult Christian music.

== History ==
On January 12, 1927, KGEY was licensed and went on the air with only 15 watts of power on 1490 kHz. The station was privately owned but was primarily used to promote the small college where the station was based. By the next year, a new transmitter had been installed and sold to the current owners, Pillar of Fire. On March 9, 1928, the Federal Radio Commission authorized the sale and change of call sign to KPOF. In those early days of broadcasting, most of the programs were produced live with the musical talent and speakers on location.

In the 1930s, KPOF moved to 880 kHz, at 500 watts, as a shared time radio station. When the North American Regional Broadcasting Agreement went into effect on March 29, 1941, it moved to its current frequency of 910 kHz, broadcasting with 1,000 watts. KPOF still had to share the frequency with a station in Greeley, KFKA, with each station agreeing to broadcast only at certain times of the day. A few years later, KFKA moved to AM 1310, where it remains today. That allowed KPOF to broadcast full time on 910 kHz.

KPOF is the ninth oldest continuously licensed broadcast station in Colorado and the first in the state to broadcast in HD Radio. It is the oldest station in the Pillar of Fire Church Network, headquartered in Zarephath, New Jersey, which is the oldest chain of Christian radio stations in the world. KPOF and the Pillar of Fire were established by Bishop Alma Bridwell White.

== Translator ==
Call sign	Frequency	City of license	FID	ERP (W)	Class	Transmitter coordinates	FCC info
K274DF	102.7 FM	Denver, Colorado	202881	250 vertical	D	39°50′47″N 105°2′0.9″W	LMS

== See also ==
- List of radio stations in Colorado
- KFCO in Bennett, Colorado
- KJHM in Watkins, Colorado
- WAWZ in Zarephath, New Jersey
- WAKW in Cincinnati, Ohio
