= WAKW =

Contemporary Christian music radio station in Cincinnati

- Cincinnati, Ohio; United States
- Broadcast area: Cincinnati, Ohio
- Frequency: 93.3 MHz
- Branding: Star 93.3

Programming
- Format: Christian adult contemporary

Ownership
- Owner: Pillar of Fire International

History
- First air date: 1961
- Call sign meaning: Arthur Kent White

Technical information
- Licensing authority: FCC
- Facility ID: 52599
- Class: B
- ERP: 50,000 watts
- HAAT: 150 meters (490 ft)
- Transmitter coordinates: 39°12′19″N 84°33′23″W

Links
- Public license information: Public file; LMS
- Webcast: Listen Live
- Website: star933.com

WAKW (93.3 FM, "STAR 93.3") is a Christian adult contemporary music radio station located in Cincinnati, Ohio. It is a listener-supported radio station owned by Pillar of Fire International. The Class B, 50,000-watt signal reaches the greater Cincinnati area, including Northern Kentucky and Eastern Indiana. The station broadcasts with an effective radiated power of 50,000 watts.

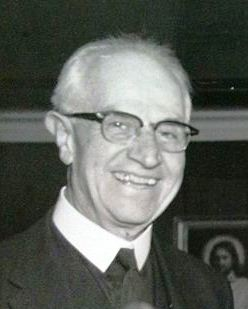
Bishop Arthur Kent White (1889–1981) WAKW's Namesake

== History ==
In 1959, during the tenure of Dr. Johannes Maas as pastor of the Pillar of Fire Church and principal of Eden Grove Academy in Cincinnati, he envisioned starting a radio station similar to the Zarephath station, WAWZ, where he had served on the staff. He contacted Rev. Russell Croucher, the manager and chief technician at WAWZ, and together they made plans that led to the application to the FCC for a new FM station to be located on the Eden Grove Academy campus. The application was approved in 1961. In honor of the leadership and counsel of Bishop White, the call letters of the new station were named after his initials, WAKW.

WAKW began broadcasting in 1961. While the call letters have remained the same the station has been known by many different names, including Majesty 93 and New Life 93. In March 2008, WAKW rebranded as STAR 93.3 to unify its branding with WAWZ.

In 2024 2025,and 2026 WAKW has been the first non-stunting analog station in north America to adopt the all-Christmas music format, doing so both years on October 31.
