= Robert Barney Dallenbach =

American Christian leader and author (1927–2025)

5th General Superintendent of Pillar of Fire International
- In office 2000–2008
- Preceded by: Donald Justin Wolfram
- Succeeded by: Joseph Gross

Personal details
- Born: August 6, 1927
- Died: March 16, 2025 (aged 97)

Robert Barney Dallenbach (August 6, 1927 – March 16, 2025) was an American bishop in the Pillar of Fire International. He also was the church's fifth general superintendent until losing a vote of confidence at the 2008 Pillar of Fire annual camp meeting convention. He also served as a director for the North Metro Arts Alliance in Colorado. He was the author of seven books.

== Biography ==
Dallenbach was born on August 6, 1927, and was the brother of CART driver Wally Dallenbach Sr.

He pastored at the Alma Temple in Westminster, Colorado, and he served as president of Belleview College and was the general manager of Christian radio AM 910, KPOF.

Dallenbach married Pauline White (1927-2019) in 1949. They have two children: Alma Beth Walker, and Joel. Pauline is the daughter of Arthur Kent White, and the granddaughter of Alma Bridwell White, the founder of the church.

He succeeded Donald Justin Wolfram when he retired in the summer of 2000.

Dallenbach died on March 16, 2025, at the age of 97.
