= The Good Citizen =

US anti-Catholic political periodical (1913–1933)

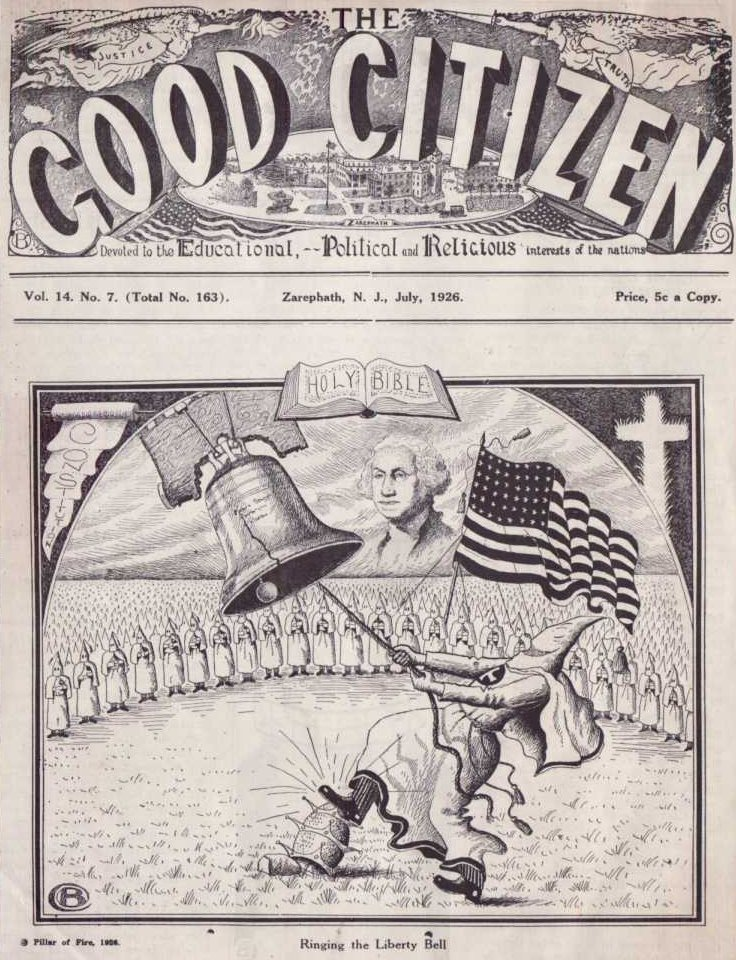
- Cover page July 1926
- Editor: Alma White
- Staff writers: Alma White, Arthur Kent White, Ray Bridwell White, Charles William Bridwell (1872-1952), Albert L. Wolfram (1877-1962), L. S. Noblitt, Minnie Noblitt
- Categories: Political
- Frequency: Monthly
- Publisher: Pillar of Fire
- First issue: 1913
- Final issue: 1933
- Country: United States
- Based in: Zarephath, New Jersey
- Language: English

The Good Citizen was a sixteen-page monthly political periodical edited by Alma White and illustrated by Branford Clarke. The Good Citizen was published from 1913 until 1933 by Pillar of Fire at their headquarters in Zarephath, New Jersey in the United States. White used the publication to expose "political Romanism in its efforts to gain the ascendancy in the U.S."

In 1915, the publication's anti-Catholic rhetoric aroused the local population in Plainfield, New Jersey and a mob formed to threaten Pillar of Fire. By 1921, the publication was a strong supporter of the Ku Klux Klan.

== Content ==
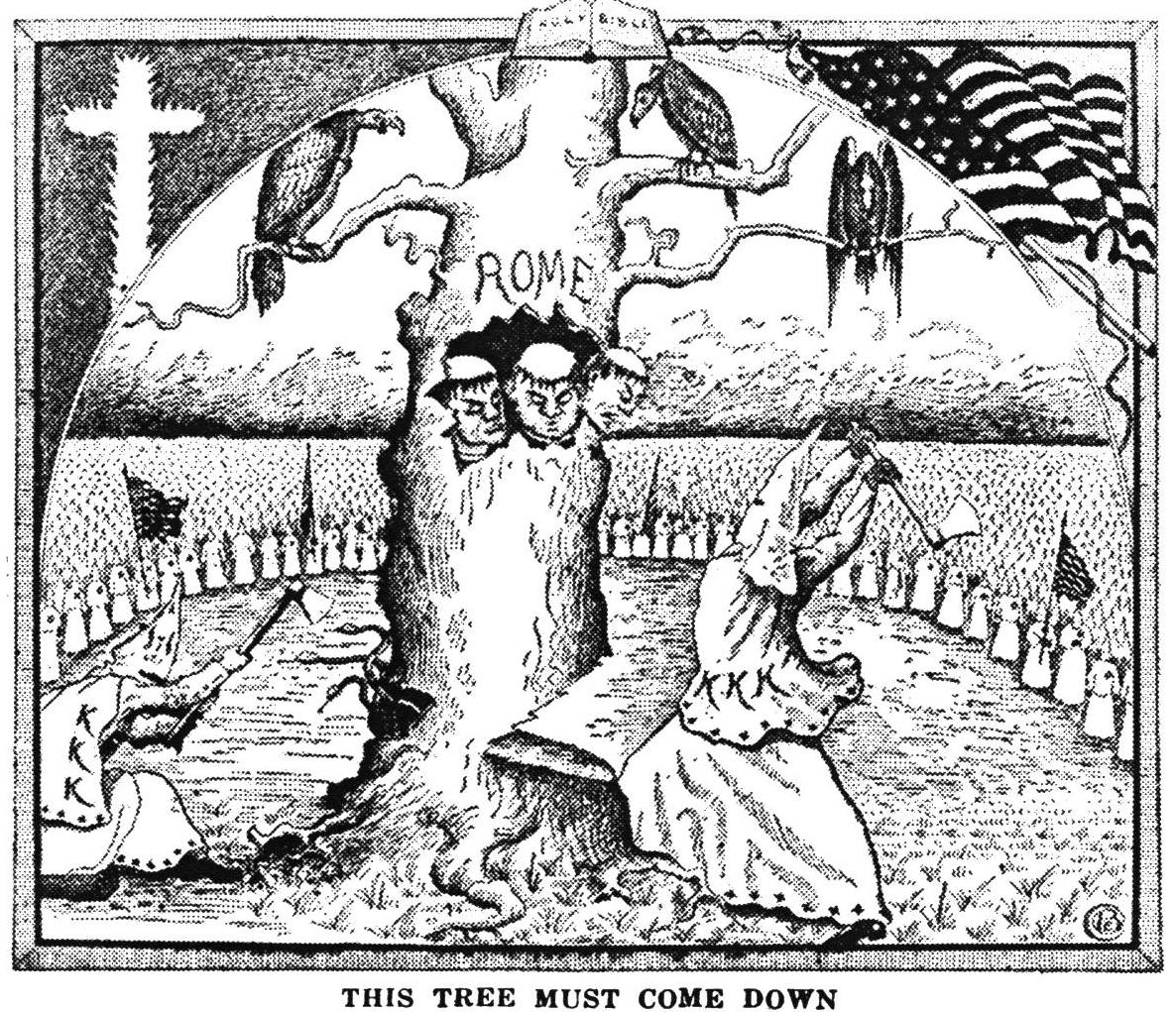
1925 illustration in The Ku Klux Klan in Prophecy

The Good Citizen espoused the political views of Alma White and consisted of essays, speeches and cartoons promoting women's equality, anti-Catholicism, antisemitism, nativism, white supremacy and the Ku Klux Klan.

The tract also frequently contained numerous topically provocative illustrations by Branford Clarke, a poet and artist.

== Ku Klux Klan and anti-Catholicism ==
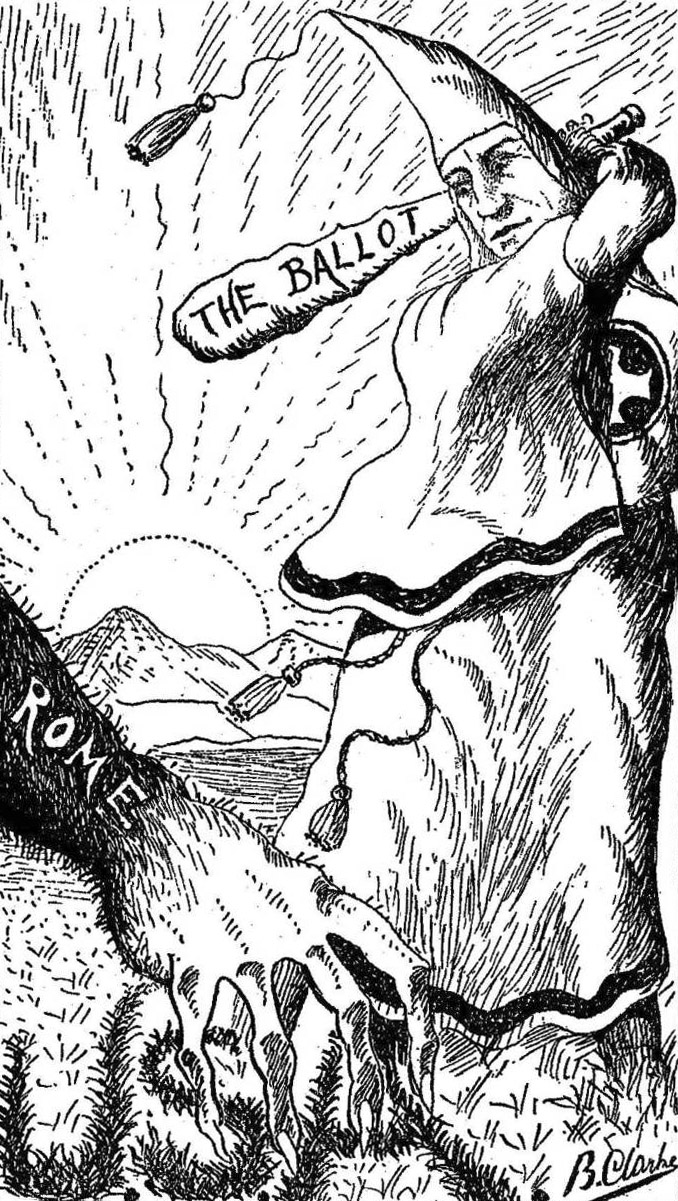
1928 illustration in Heroes of the Fiery Cross

According to Wyn Craig Wade in his 1998 book The Fiery Cross:

[Alma White] was also probably the most active and prolific fundamentalist minister in the 1920s. ... Her value to the Klan, however, came from her viciously anti-Catholic magazine, The Good Citizen, and her easily readable theological tracts that simultaneously found scriptural support for the Invisible Empire [the KKK] and excoriation for the Catholic Church. ... Her books abounded with conspiracy themes: "We hail the K.K.K. in the great movement that is now on foot ... Were it not that the press is throttled by Rome and her Hebrew allies, astounding revelations would be made, showing the public the necessity for the rising of the Heroes of the Fiery Cross."

== White supremacy and racism against African Americans ==
The following is from the text of a speech given by Alma White on December 31, 1922 at Pillar of Fire at 123 Sterling Place, Brooklyn, New York and published in the February, 1923 (Vol. 11 No. 2) edition of The Good Citizen. The speech is titled "Ku Klux Klan and Woman's Causes" and the section of the speech which is reprinted below is titled "White Supremacy."

The Klansmen stand for the supremacy of the white race, which is perfectly legitimate and in accordance with the teachings of the Holy Writ, and anything that has been decreed by the Almighty should not work a hardship on the colored race...It is within the rights of civilization for the white race to hold the supremacy; and no injustice to the colored man to stay in the environment where he was placed by the Creator.

... When the black man was liberated it was time for women to be enfranchised, without which the colored man with his newly acquired rank became her political master. Such reflections make one feel that man's delinquency has been almost unpardonable.

...The white women bore the sting of humiliation for more than half a century in being placed in an inferior position to the black men in the use of the ballot and the rights of citizenship...

To whom shall we look to champion the cause and to protect the rights of women? Is there not evidence that the Knights of the Klu [sic] Klux Klan are the prophets of a new and better age?

== Books from The Good Citizen ==
White published three books that were compendiums of the essays, speeches and cartoons from it entitled The Ku Klux Klan in Prophecy (1925), Klansmen: Guardians of Liberty (1926), and Heroes of the Fiery Cross (1928). In 1943 White reprinted her Klan books as a three volume set under the title Guardians of Liberty.

In 1929, Ray Bridwell White, White's son and president of Zarephath Bible Institute published The Truth in Satire Concerning Infallible Popes which also was a compendium of his essays that had originally been published in The Good Citizen.

== Backlash ==
In 1918, 500 members of the New York City Catholic parish of Our Lady of Lourdes called on the United States Postmaster General to exclude The Good Citizen from the US mail.

== Existing copies ==
Copies of The Good Citizen are available in six US libraries:

- Brigham Young University Library (extensive collection)
- Denver Public Library
- University of Texas Libraries - Austin
- Duke University Library
- Syracuse University
- New York Public Library (extensive collection)
