= William Baxter Godbey =

Evangelist

William Baxter Godbey (June 3, 1833 - September 12, 1920) was a Wesleyan Methodist evangelist.

== Biography ==
He was born June 3, 1833, in Pulaski County, Kentucky. He converted Alma White in a Kentucky schoolhouse revival in 1878. She wrote that "some were so convicted that they left the room and threw up their suppers, and staggered back into the house as pale as death."
