= Alma Bridwell White =

Founder of the Pillar of Fire Church

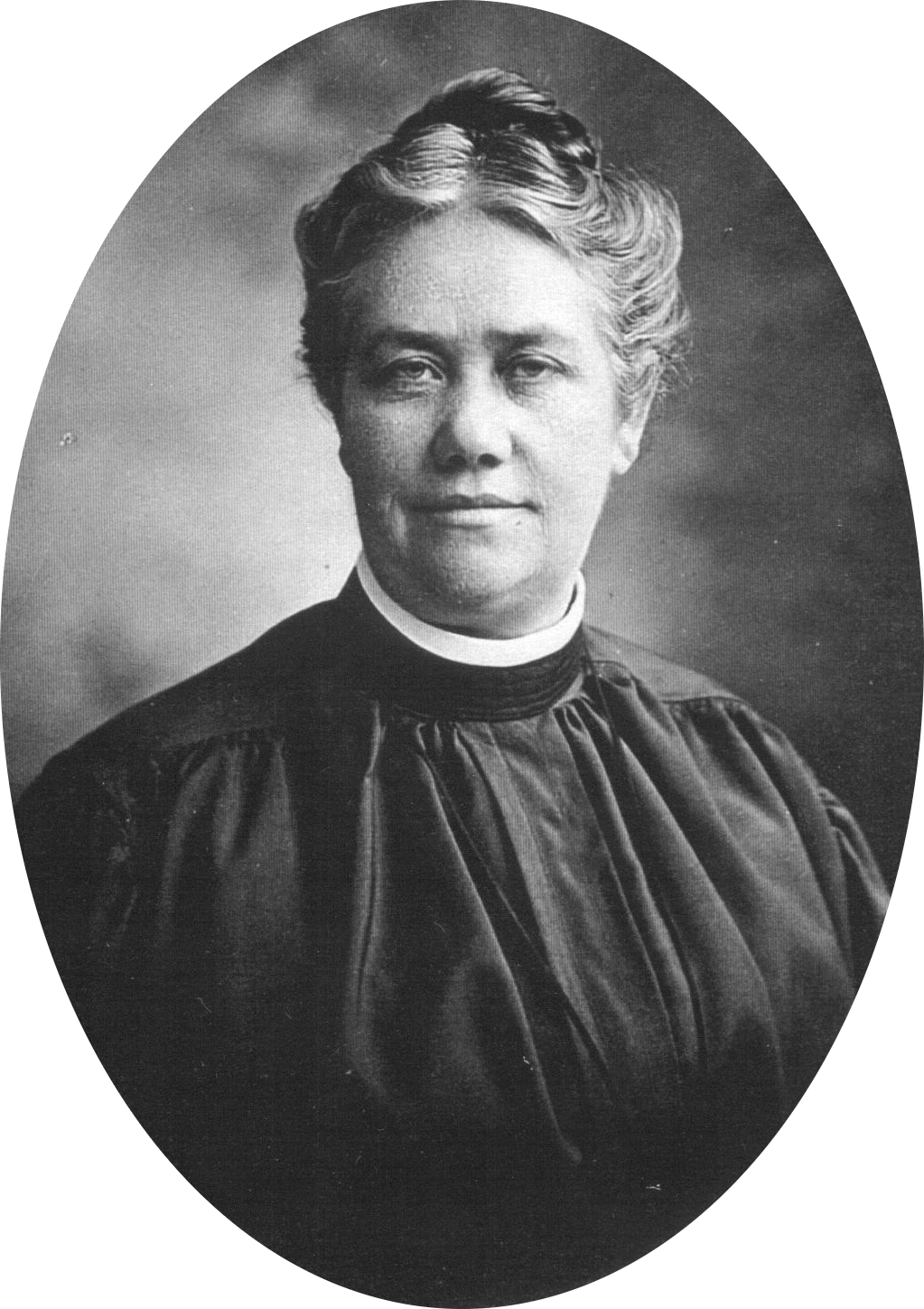
- White circa 1900–1910

1st General Superintendent of Pillar of Fire International
- In office 1918–1946
- Succeeded by: Arthur Kent White

Personal details
- Born: Mollie Alma Bridwell; June 16, 1862 Lewis County, Kentucky
- Died: June 26, 1946 (aged 84) Zarephath, New Jersey
- Spouse: Kent White (m. 1887; died 1940)
- Children: Ray Bridwell White; Arthur Kent White
- Parent(s): Mary Ann Harrison (1832–1921); William Moncure Bridwell (1825–1907)
- Relatives: Arlene White Lawrence, granddaughter Kathleen Merrell White, daughter-in-law
- Known for: First woman to become a bishop in the United States. Feminist, noted supporter of the Ku Klux Klan.

Alma Bridwell White (June 16, 1862 – June 26, 1946) was the founder and a bishop of the Pillar of Fire Church. In 1918, she became the first woman bishop of Pillar of Fire in the United States. She was a proponent of feminism. She also associated herself with the Ku Klux Klan and was involved in anti-Catholicism, antisemitism, anti-Pentecostalism, racism, and nativism. By the time of her death at age 84, she had expanded the sect to "4,000 followers, 61 churches, seven schools, ten periodicals and two broadcasting stations."

== Birth and early years ==
She was born Mollie Alma Bridwell on June 16, 1862, in Kinniconick, Kentucky, to William Moncure Bridwell of Virginia and Mary Ann Harrison of Kentucky. She was the seventh of eleven children.

William Baxter Godbey converted her at the age of 16 to Wesleyan Methodism in a Kentucky schoolhouse revival meeting in 1878. She wrote that "some were so convicted that they left the room and threw up their suppers, and staggered back into the house as pale as death." By 1880, the family was living in Millersburg, Kentucky.

She studied at the Millersburg Female College in Millersburg. An aunt invited one of the seven Bridwell sisters to visit Montana Territory. All of them were afraid to make the journey, except for Alma, the aunt's last choice. In 1882, nineteen-year-old Alma traveled to Bannack, Montana. She stayed to teach, first in public school, and later in Salt Lake City's Methodist seminary. On December 21, 1887, she married Kent White (1860–1940), who at the time was a Methodist seminarian. They had two sons, Ray Bridwell White and Arthur Kent White.

== Church founder ==
Alma and Kent White started the Methodist Pentecostal Union Church in Denver, Colorado, in December 1901. She led hymns and prayers, and at times preached sermons. In 1907, Caroline Garretson (formerly Carolin Van Neste Field), widow of Peter Workman Garretson, donated a farm for a religious community at Zarephath, New Jersey.

This was developed as the headquarters for the renamed Pillar of Fire Church, which distanced itself from the Pentecostal movement. In 1918, White was consecrated as a bishop by William Baxter Godbey, an ordained Methodist evangelist who was active in the Holiness Movement. She was now the first woman to serve as a bishop in the United States.

=== Feminism, intolerance, and the Klan ===
As a feminist, White was a forceful advocate of equality for white Protestant women. However, she was also uncompromising in her persistent and powerful attacks on religious and racial minorities, justifying both equality for white Protestant women and inequality for minorities as biblically mandated. While the vast majority of her most vicious political attacks targeted the Roman Catholic Church, she also promoted antisemitism, white supremacy, and intolerance of certain immigrants.

Under White's leadership in the 1920s and 1930s, the Pillar of Fire Church developed a close and public partnership with the Ku Klux Klan that was unique for a religious denomination. She assessed the Klan as a powerful force that could help liberate white Protestant women, while simultaneously keeping minorities in their place. Her support of the Klan was extensive. She allowed and sometimes participated in Klan meetings and cross burnings on some of the numerous Pillar of Fire properties. She published The Good Citizen, a monthly periodical which strongly promoted the Klan and its agenda. Additionally, she published three books, The Ku Klux Klan in Prophecy, Klansmen: Guardians of Liberty, and Heroes of the Fiery Cross, which were compendiums of the essays, speeches and cartoons that had originally been published in The Good Citizen.

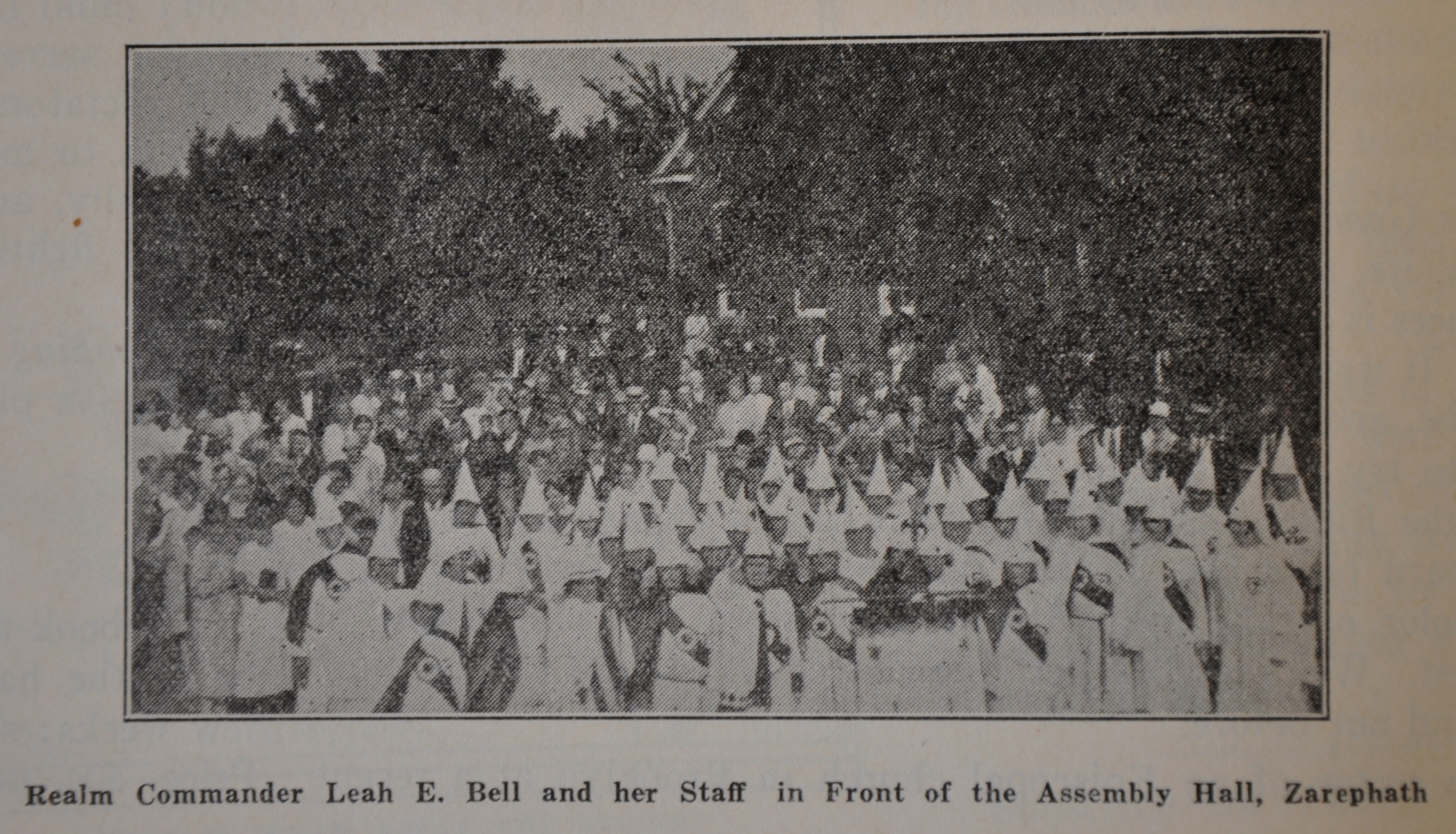
Klan gathering on August 31, 1929, in front of Assembly Hall, Zarephath, New Jersey, for "Patriotic Day" during the Pillar of Fire Church's annual Camp Meeting.

White expressed her racism against African Americans most vocally when speaking at Klan gatherings. On "Patriotic Day" at the 1929 annual Camp Meeting at Zarephath, New Jersey, she preached a sermon titled "America—the White Man's Heritage", and published the sermon in that month's edition of The Good Citizen. She said:

Where people seek for social equality between the black and white races, they violate the edicts of the Holy Writ and every social and moral code ...

Social and political equality would plunge the world into an Inferno as black as the regions of night and as far from the teachings of the New Testament as heaven is from hell. The presumption of the colored people under such conditions would know no bounds ...

This is white man's country by every law of God and man, and was so determined from the beginning of Creation. Let us not therefore surrender our heritage to the sons of Ham. Perhaps it would be well for white people to take the advice of a great American patriot, Dr. Hiram Wesley Evans and repeal the Fifteenth Amendment. The editor of The Good Citizen would be with him in this.

White's association with the Klan waned in the early 1930s, after the Klan underwent public scandals related to high-level officials and efforts by the media to publicize its members' identities. Still, she continued to promote her ideology of intolerance for religious and racial minorities. She published revised versions of her three Klan books in 1943, three years before her death and 22 years after her initial public association with the Klan. The books were published as a three-volume set under the name Guardians of Liberty. Notably, the word Klansmen was removed from the title, reflecting the Klan's diminished status, while White continued to promote the dogma that had initially drawn her into partnership with the Klan. Volumes Two and Three of Guardians of Liberty have introductions by Arthur Kent White, her son and the Pillar of Fire's second general superintendent.

=== Vegetarianism ===
In 1915, White authored the book Why I Do Not Eat Meat, in which she laid out her vegetarian beliefs. She promoted the diet amongst her Pillar of Fire Church followers.

== Rivalry ==
Time magazine wrote on October 22, 1928:

Aimee Semple McPherson [spoke] ... Worst of all, there came a rival female evangelist from New Jersey, a resolute woman with the mien of an inspired laundress — the Reverend "Bishop" Mrs. Mollie Alma White, founder and primate of the Pillar of Fire Church. Bishop White, who has thousands of disciples ("Holy Jumpers") in the British Isles, clearly regarded Mrs. McPherson as a poacher upon her preserves or worse. Squired by two male Deacons, the Reverend Bishop sat herself down in a box at Albert Hall, with an air of purposing to break up the revival. The dread potency of Bishop White, when aroused against another female, may be judged from her scathing criticisms of the Church of Mary Baker Eddy: "The teachings of the so-called Christian Science Church ... have drawn multitudes from the orthodox faith, and blasted their hopes of heaven! ... A person who is thus in the grip of Satanic power is unable to extricate himself ... [and is] left in utter spiritual desolation." Well might buxom Aimee McPherson have quailed as she faced 2,000 tepid Britons, over 8,000 empty seats, the two Deacons and "Bishop" Mrs. White.

== Radio stations ==
In 1927, a transmitter and radio equipment were installed at Belleview College in Westminster, Colorado, to promote the college based in the Westminster Castle. By June 1929, the call letters had been changed to KPOF and the station was broadcasting regular sermons from Alma Temple, the Pillar's Denver Church. In March 1931, WBNY was sold to White and the Pillar of Fire Church for $5,000. The call letters were changed to WAWZ (the letters standing for Alma White, Zarephath). In its initial broadcast, she told listeners, "The station belongs to all regardless of your affiliation." In 1961, Pillar of Fire also started WAKW in Cincinnati. The AKW represents the name of Arthur Kent White, Alma's son.

== Death ==
She died on June 26, 1946, in Zarephath, New Jersey.

== In popular culture ==
Alma White, the Pillar of Fire, and their association with the Klan are dramatized in Libba Bray's 2012 murder mystery The Diviners, in a chapter titled "The Good Citizen".

== Publications ==
- Looking Back from Beulah Denver: The Pentecostal Union (1902)
- Demons and Tongues Bound Brook, N.J., The Pentecostal union (1910)
- The Harp of Gold (1911) with Arthur Kent White
- My Trip to the Orient Bound Brook, N.J. : The Pentecostal Union (Pillar of fire) 1911
- The New Testament Church (1911–1912) in two volumes
- Truth Stranger Than Fiction Zarephath, N.J. : The Pentecostal Union, Pillar of Fire (1913)
- The Titanic Tragedy: God Speaking to Nations
- Why I Do Not Eat Meat Zarephath, N.J. : The Pentecostal Union, Pillar of Fire (1915)
- Alma White (1917). Restoration of Israel. The Pentecostal Union. (1917)
- The Story of My Life (1919–1930) in five volumes
- Alma White (1925). Ku Klux Klan in Prophecy. The Good Citizen. ISBN 1-4286-1075-8.
- Alma White (1926). Klansmen: Guardians of Liberty. The Good Citizen. ISBN 1-4254-9000-X.
- Alma White (1927). Musings of the Past. Pillar of fire. (1927)
- Alma White (1928). Heroes of the Fiery Cross. The Good Citizen. "The Jews are as unrelenting now as they were two thousand years ago."
- Musings of the Past (1927)
- The Voice of Nature (1927)
- Hymns and Poems (1931)
- Short Sermons (1932)
- Alma White (1933). With God in the Yellowstone. Pillar of Fire. (1933)
- "Gems of Life" (1935)
- Demons and Tongues (1936)
- The Sword of the Spirit (1937)
- Alma White (1943). Guardians of Liberty. Pillar of Fire Church. "Who are members of the Invisible Empire? White, gentile, American-born Protestants (the very best citizens of the United States) ..."

== Gallery ==
Pillar of Fire, November 25, 1914

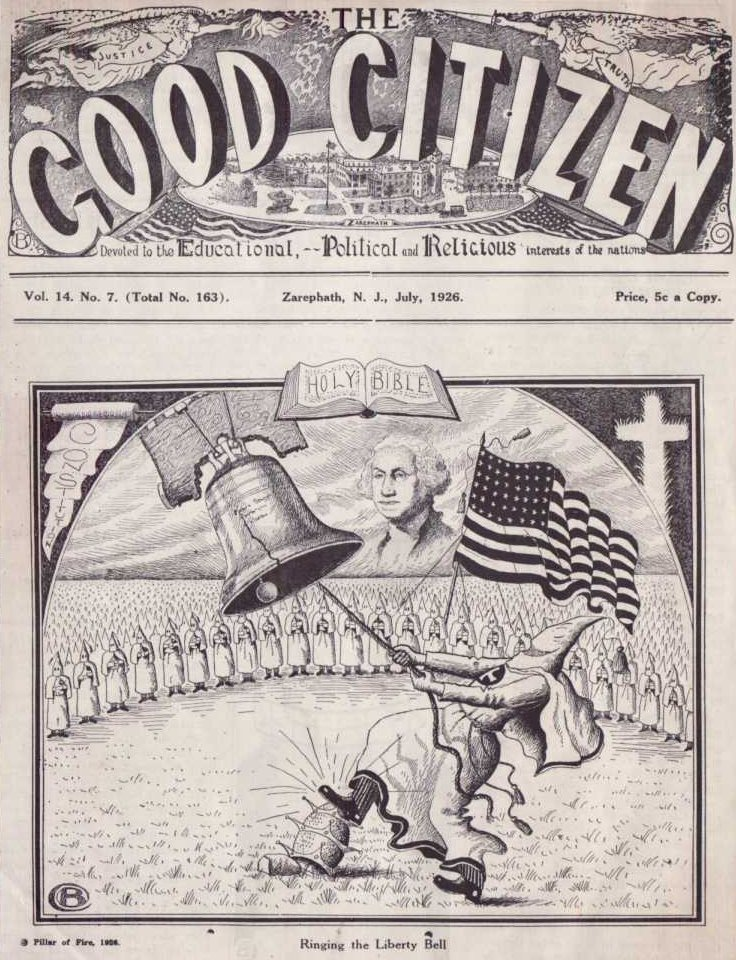
The Good Citizen, July 1926

Alma White at various ages

== See also ==
- Ku Klux Klan in New Jersey
