= Westminster Castle =

- Westminster University
- U.S. National Register of Historic Places
- Colorado State Register of Historic Properties
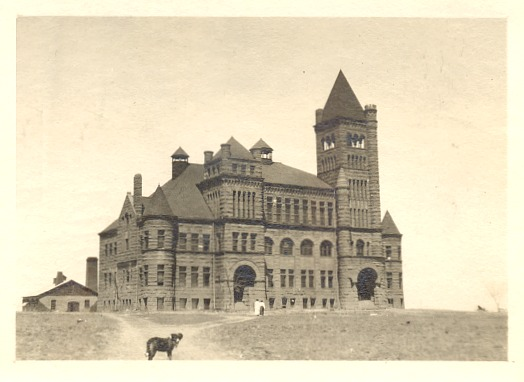
- The Stanford White-designed Westminster Castle around 1908
- Location: 3455 W. 83rd Ave; Westminster, Colorado
- Coordinates: 39°50′50.28″N 105°1′53.19″W
- Built: 1892
- Architect: E.B. Gregory and Stanford B. White
- Architectural style: Richardsonian Romanesque
- NRHP reference No.: 79000572
- CSRHP No.: 5AM.67
- Added to NRHP: August 10, 1979

The Westminster Castle, also locally known as "The Pillar of Fire" is a historic landmark located in Westminster, Colorado, northwest of Denver near the intersection of 83rd and Federal. It is listed on the National Register of Historic Places as Westminster University. The building was built in 1893, but not occupied until 1908.

== Conception to construction ==
Westminster University was first conceptualized in 1890 by New Yorker Henry T. Mayham who convinced the Denver Presbytery to build a Presbyterian University on land that he owned on Crown Point, the highest point in what was then Arapaho County.

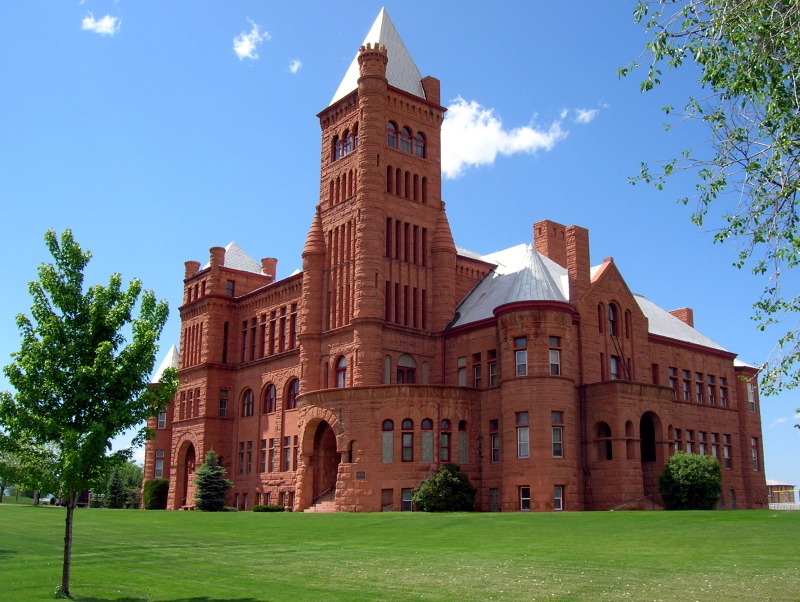
Westminster Castle, 2008

Architect E.B. Gregory designed and laid the cornerstone for the university's main building, which was to be constructed of gray stone from the Coal Creek area. After delays in construction caused by lack of funds, Mayham hired New York architect Stanford White to finish the design and oversee construction. White changed a main design element, the stone, to a red sandstone from the Red Rocks/Manitou area. White's design was completed by 1893: 160 ft frontage, 80 ft depth, three stories tall, with a distinctive 175 ft tall tower. The building's architectural style is an excellent example of Richardsonian Romanesque.

== The Princeton of the West ==
Although the construction was completed in 1893, the doors of Westminster University did not open until September 17, 1908 due to the Panic of 1893 and competition from a nearby Presbyterian college. Mayham's persistent fund-raising paid off when the first 60 students began classes in 1908. Tuition was $50 per year and included indoor plumbing.

In 1911, the small farming community around the university, then known as Harris, voted to incorporate as a city. At that time, Harris decided to change its name to Westminster in honor of the university. The school continued in operation until 1917 when enrollment numbers dropped completely due to World War I.

== Pillar of Fire ==
At its peak, the Crown Point property was worth nearly a half a million dollars. But after the devastating closure and three-year abandonment it was purchased by Bishop Alma Bridwell White of the White nationalist Pillar of Fire Church for $40,000 on January 31, 1920. Included in the sale was the main college building, 45 acres (180,000 m^{2}) of land, a power plant, and two houses (one a student's dormitory, the other the President's house.)

The sale was a good deal, but the state of the buildings left the church with $75,000 worth of repairs. Shattered windows, cracked walls, and broken plaster were the main structural complaints, but the once regal building had also become a glorified barn with thousands of chickens in the basement and farm machinery on the first floor.

In spite of the enormity of the work, the new Westminster University opened to students on September 7, 1920, just eight months after the purchase. Within six years of opening, the school, now known as Belleview Schools, had received its educational accreditation and was ready for decades of education.

In the late 1920s, the campus was frequently used for Ku Klux Klan meetings and cross burnings. In 1997, the Pillar of Fire Church, the school's owner and parent organization, repudiated its historical association with the Klan.

== Today ==
Belleview Christian Schools still reside on the Westminster University campus which is home to Belleview Christian Childcare & PreSchool (ages 1–4) and Belleview Christian School (K–12). Although most of the teaching happens in newer buildings on the campus, classes continue in the historic main building which was entered on the National Register of Historic Places in 1979. The building is also the home of KPOF AM91 Radio, Colorado's first station to broadcast in HD Radio.

== See also ==
- National Register of Historic Places listings in Adams County, Colorado
