= WAWZ =

Radio station in Zarephath, New Jersey

- Zarephath, New Jersey; United States
- Broadcast area: North Jersey; New York City; Central Jersey
- Frequency: 99.1 MHz (HD Radio)
- Branding: Star 99.1

Programming
- Format: Contemporary Christian; Gospel music
- Subchannels: HD2: Gospel songs; HD3: "FLO Positive Hip-Hop" (Christian hip-hop)

Ownership
- Owner: Pillar of Fire International

History
- First air date: August 22, 1954
- Former call signs: WAWZ-FM (1953–1984)
- Call sign meaning: Alma White (founder of owner); Zarephath (community of license)

Technical information
- Licensing authority: FCC
- Facility ID: 52601
- Class: B
- ERP: 28,000 watts
- HAAT: 200 meters (660 ft)
- Transmitter coordinates: 40.611°N 74.570°W

Links
- Public license information: Public file; LMS
- Webcast: Listen live
- Website: upliftingstar.com/star991/

WAWZ (99.1 FM) is a Christian radio station licensed to serve Zarephath, New Jersey. The station is owned by the non-profit organization Pillar Media, a division of the Pillar of Fire International.

The station maintains a studio in Warren, while its transmitter is located in Bridgewater.

WAWZ's signal can be heard through parts of Central and Northern New Jersey and New York City, reaching as far south as Ocean and Burlington counties, as well as Eastern Pennsylvania.

== History ==
WAWZ was founded in 1931 by Pillar of Fire, a small Christian denomination started in Colorado. It became the second station owned by the Pillar of Fire Church, with KPOF in Denver, Colorado, being the first. The call letters for WAWZ were chosen to honor Bishop Alma White, the founder of the Pillar of Fire Church, and Zarephath, its community of license.

The station was first assigned a frequency of 1350 AM, sharing time equally with three other stations: WCDA, WBNX, and WMSG. In later years, at 1380 AM, it shared time with WBNX in New York City.

In the 1920s, 1930s, and 1940s, the organization was vocal in its support of the Ku Klux Klan, which was unique for a religious denomination. Alma White extensively spoke and wrote about both her and the Pillar of Fire Church's support of the Klan and many of its principles, including anti-Catholicism, white supremacy, antisemitism, nativism, and temperance.

In 1954, the station purchased its spot on the FM dial for approximately $5,000. The modern value of that frequency is estimated to be more than $60 million.

On September 1, 1984, WAWZ sold its part-time AM operation to New York station WBNX. On WAWZ's final day, they produced a special program recalling the station's 53 years of religious broadcasting and, via electrical transcriptions, once again featured the voice of Alma White.

WAWZ began airing its current format of contemporary Christian music and gospel as "STAR 99.1" in 2003. Previously, the station played traditional Christian music and church services as well as Christian programs. By the mid 1980's the music evolved to a mix of traditional and softer contemporary Christian music and by the 1990s evolved to soft adult contemporary Christian music along with worship contemporary music.

On August 1, 2014, Pillar of Fire began leasing WLIR-FM (107.1) in Hampton Bays, New York, bringing WAWZ's programming to the East End of Long Island. WLIR-FM was rebranded as "Star 107.1". The lease ended in April 2015, and WLIR-FM reverted to the Christian-formatted "Hope Radio" until early 2015, when the station was sold.

== Accolades ==
WAWZ received "Station of the Year" awards from National Religious Broadcasters in 2007 and 2008, and the "Crystal Radio Award" from the National Association of Broadcasters in 2008 for its contributions to the community.

== HD radio ==
WAWZ broadcasts in HD Radio with its HD1, HD2, and HD3 channels, providing Artist Experience data, including song titles, artists, and albums on compatible radios. Over the years, 99.1 FM has hosted various formats on its HD sub-channels. The current HD sub-channel formats are:

- HD2 - Gospel songs (replaced Christian teaching subchannel in early 2016)
- HD3 - The Energy (Christian rock and hip hop) (Launched in 2007 to coincide with the station-sponsored annual youth festival, "Autumn Blaze 2007"). The Energy ceased transmissions in 2014 but resumed in early 2015. It was changed to FLO Positive Hip Hop in January 2025.

=== Previous sub-channels ===
- HD2 - Christian teaching (The eight-hour block of teaching programs, which first signed in April 2006, resembled the station's mid-1990s format, including the use of the former tagline, "WAWZ – Your Voice of Faith and Inspiration.")
