= Zarephath, New Jersey =

Populated place in Somerset County, New Jersey, US

- Census-designated place
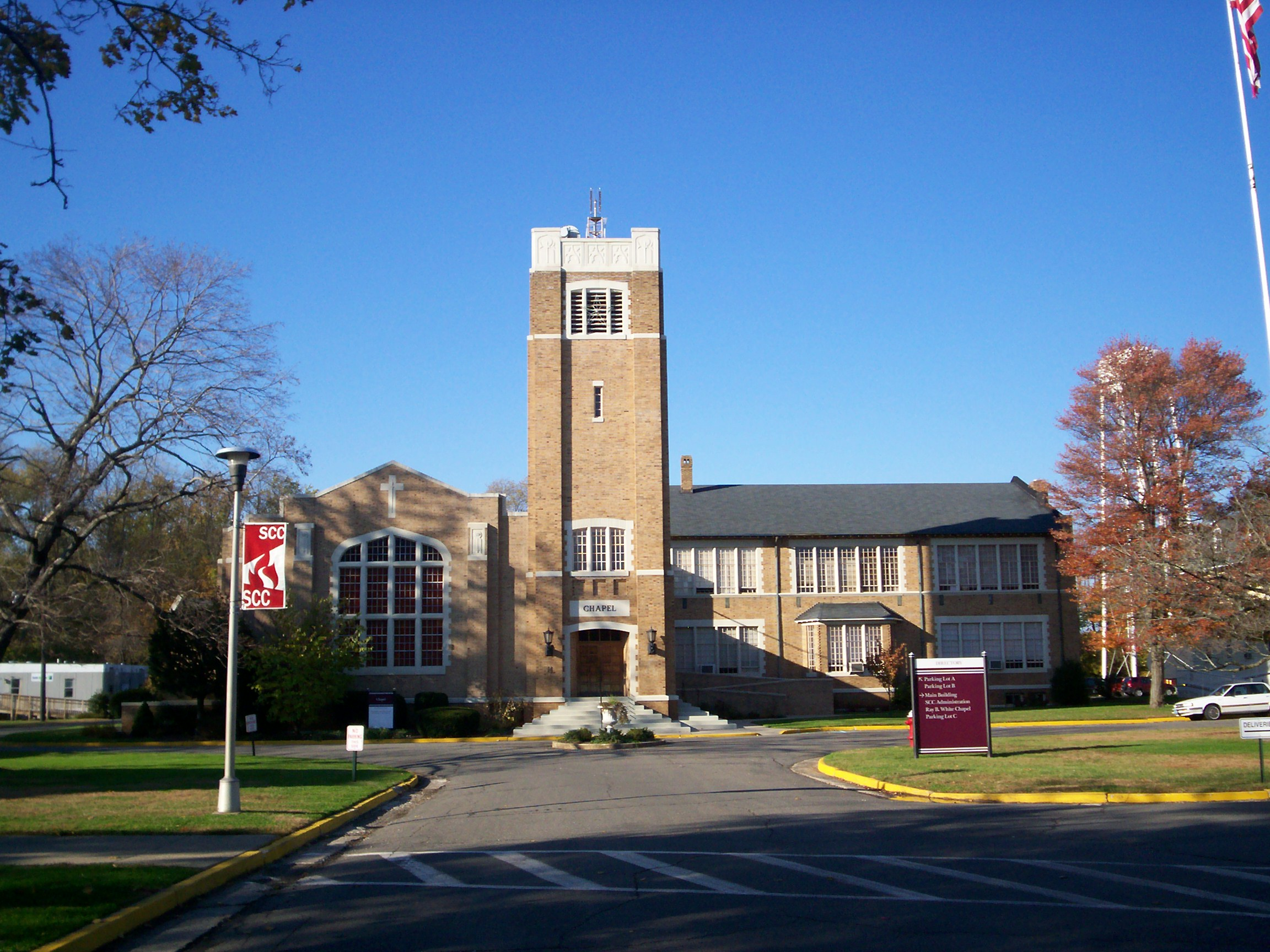
- Pillar of Fire chapel in Zarephath, New Jersey

- Location in Somerset County Location in New Jersey Location in the United States
- Coordinates: 40.534573°N 74.572191°W
- Country: United States
- State: New Jersey
- County: Somerset
- Township: Franklin

Area
  - Total: 0.44 sq mi (1.13 km^{2})
  - Land: 0.40 sq mi (1.04 km^{2})
  - Water: 0.035 sq mi (0.09 km^{2}) 9.12%
- Elevation: 75 ft (23 m)

Population (2020)
  - Total: 69
  - Density: 172.5/sq mi (66.6/km^{2})
- Time zone: UTC−05:00 (Eastern (EST))
  - Summer (DST): UTC−04:00 (Eastern (EDT))
- ZIP Code: 08890
- Area code: 908
- FIPS code: 34-83290
- GNIS feature ID: 02584041

Zarephath (/ˈzærəˌfæθ/, ZARRA-fath) is an unincorporated community and census-designated place (CDP) and located in Franklin Township, in Somerset County, in the U.S. state of New Jersey, about 15 mi (24 km) north of Princeton. As of the 2020 United States census, the CDP's population was 69, an increase of 32 (+86.5%) from the 37 enumerated at the 2010 census.

It was the communal home of the Pillar of Fire Church, and was the worldwide headquarters of Pillar of Fire International, which comprises the church's college, Somerset Christian College, and radio station WAWZ-FM (the farm and publishing facilities have not been in operation since the late 1970s). It is named after Zarephath, the place in the Bible where the "widow woman" sustained the prophet Elijah. Zarephath was a group of buildings located between the Delaware and Raritan Canal and the Millstone River. Following the flooding in 2011 from Hurricane Irene, the College and all Pillar of Fire ministries were ordered to move out of this floodplain. The original campus has been slated for demolition and a new campus in Somerset was established.

== Geography ==
According to the United States Census Bureau, Zarephath had a total area of 0.445 square miles (1.152 km^{2}), including 0.404 square miles (1.047 km^{2}) of it is land and 0.041 square miles (0.105 km^{2}) of water (9.12%) is water.

== Demographics ==
Historical population
Census	Pop.	Note	%±
2010	37		—
2020	69		86.5%
Population sources: 2010 2020

Zarephath first appeared as a census designated place in the 2010 U.S. census.

=== 2020 census ===
Zarephath CDP, New Jersey – Racial and ethnic composition Note: the US Census treats Hispanic/Latino as an ethnic category. This table excludes Latinos from the racial categories and assigns them to a separate category. Hispanics/Latinos may be of any race.
Race / Ethnicity (NH = Non-Hispanic)	Pop 2010	Pop 2020	% 2010	% 2020
White alone (NH)	34	19	91.89%	27.54%
Black or African American alone (NH)	1	3	2.70%	4.35%
Native American or Alaska Native alone (NH)	0	0	0.00%	0.00%
Asian alone (NH)	0	7	0.00%	10.14%
Native Hawaiian or Pacific Islander alone (NH)	0	0	0.00%	0.00%
Other race alone (NH)	0	7	0.00%	10.14%
Mixed race or Multiracial (NH)	0	3	0.00%	4.35%
Hispanic or Latino (any race)	2	30	5.41%	43.48%
Total	37	69	100.00%	100.00%

=== 2010 census ===
The 2010 United States census counted 37 people, 19 households, and 7 families in the CDP. The population density was 91.5 per square mile (35.3/km^{2}). There were 20 housing units at an average density of 49.5 per square mile (19.1/km^{2}). The racial makeup was 97.30% (36) White, 2.70% (1) Black or African American, 0.00% (0) Native American, 0.00% (0) Asian, 0.00% (0) Pacific Islander, 0.00% (0) from other races, and 0.00% (0) from two or more races. Hispanic or Latino of any race were 5.41% (2) of the population.

Of the 19 households, 15.8% had children under the age of 18; 36.8% were married couples living together; 0.0% had a female householder with no husband present and 63.2% were non-families. Of all households, 57.9% were made up of individuals and 47.4% had someone living alone who was 65 years of age or older. The average household size was 1.95 and the average family size was 3.43.

18.9% of the population were under the age of 18, 5.4% from 18 to 24, 13.5% from 25 to 44, 10.8% from 45 to 64, and 51.4% who were 65 years of age or older. The median age was 66.5 years. For every 100 females, the population had 54.2 males. For every 100 females ages 18 and older there were 66.7 males.

== Origins ==
Pillar of Fire, November 25, 1914

The site was originally a farm owned by Peter Workman Garretson in Franklin Township. He married Caroline Van Neste Field, who became a follower of Alma Bridwell White, then based in Denver, Colorado. Field donated the land to the church after meeting her. The church assumed all debts associated with the mortgage on the property, which were considerable; it was agreed the church would take title to the land upon repayment of the mortgage. Zarephath was named from a phrase in 1 Kings 17, because White saw a parallel with relocation to a farm and the story of Elijah and a widow.

Pillar of Fire International takes its name from a phrase used in Exodus 13:21: "He guided the Israelites on their escape from Egypt by giving them a pillar of fire to light their way across the dark wilderness". It was founded by Alma White in 1901 and originally called the Pentecostal Union. They moved to Franklin Township in 1907 or 1908. The organization is also located in Denver, Colorado. The name was changed from The Pentecostal Union to Pillar of Fire in October 1917 as the group identified as Methodist rather than Pentecostal. It is now known as Pillar of Fire International. The buildings on the grounds were built by members of the Zarephath community, as they stressed self-reliance. They farmed a portion of the 1,000-acre (400 ha) property.

== Education ==
The Zarephath Bible Institute was founded in 1908 as a "training school for missionaries, preachers, and teachers." It was later renamed the Zarephath Bible Seminary.

On September 11, 1912, the Zarephath Academy opened with an enrollment of fifty students, five who were ready for high school. "At this time, the doors were formally opened to all who wanted an education under Christian control, high school as well as elementary." It was later renamed Alma Preparatory School. The first high school graduation exercises, for a class of four, were held at the Pillar of Fire Temple on June 12, 1916. The school was accredited by the New Jersey State Board of Education on November 14, 1916.

Informal college level classes were held starting in 1917.

Alma White College was chartered in 1921 and operated until 1978. In 1923 the Ku Klux Klan provided funding for the school, making it "the second institution in the north avowedly run by the Ku Klux Klan to further its aims and principles." The first two Doctor of Divinity degrees, one honorary, were conferred in 1927. Arthur Kent White received an honorary one; and Alton Milford Young received the second. Young at one time was the Grand Kaliff of the Ku Klux Klan in New Jersey.

Somerset Christian College was established on March 23, 2001. Somerset Christian College is licensed by the New Jersey Commission on Higher Education to grant a two-year associate degree in Biblical studies. Starting in fall 2006, the school started offering a four-year degree.

== Floods of 1971, 1999 and 2011 ==
Tropical Storm Doria in 1971 and Hurricane Floyd in September 1999 brought record floods to the areas adjacent to the Millstone River, which is located along one edge of the Zarephath campus. Despite maintaining a twelve-foot-high flood levee, Zarephath was inundated with water from the nearby river and Delaware and Raritan canal. In 1999 the flood crest was a record one, over three feet higher than the previously recorded crest in the river basin. The water level in the Zarephath compound was seven feet at the height of the flood. The church's damage from Floyd was estimated at $2.5 million.

Hurricane Irene destroyed much of the campus again in late August 2011 According to the Somerset Christian College website, authorities have ordered the Zarephath Campus to be abandoned because of its location in the floodplain. The school has since renamed itself Pillar College and located elsewhere in Somerset. It also conducts some classes in Newark.

== Davis Burial Ground ==
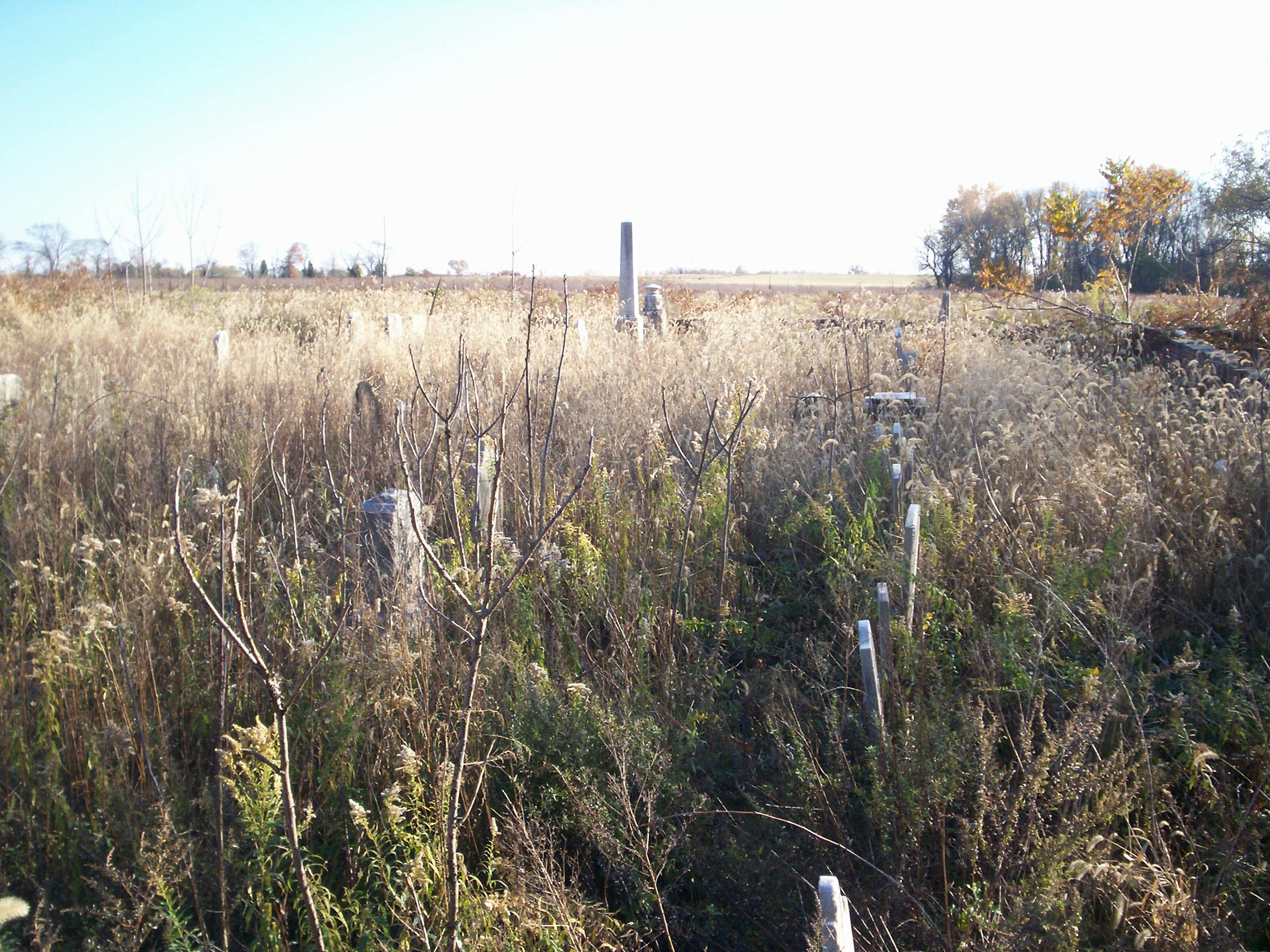

The Davis Burial Ground is on Weston Canal Road near the Delaware and Raritan Canal. It contains about 100 graves with maybe 50 extant tombstones, including those of Simeon Van Nortwick II (1724–1813), son of Simeon Van Nortwick I (1687–c.1774) of Utrecht, Netherlands and Folkease Volkertje (c.1690–?). On the opposite side of the canal is a similar cemetery, Van Nest – Weston Burying Ground in Manville.

== Gallery ==
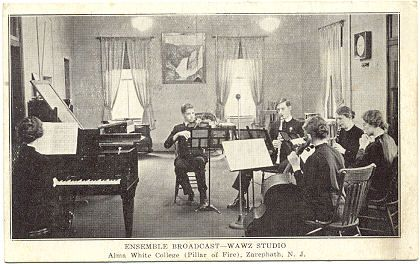
Music ensemble broadcast at Alma White College, Pillar of Fire Church, on WAWZ Radio, Zarephath, New Jersey circa 1920

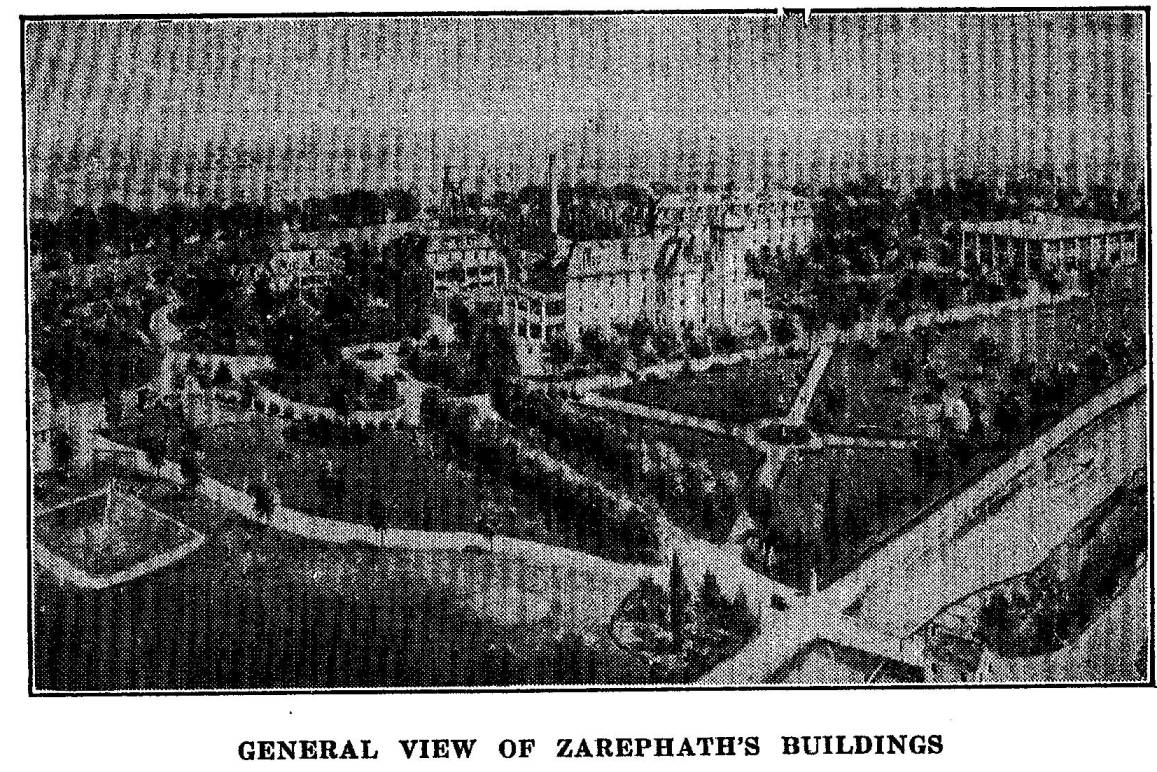
Historical photo of Zarephath campus from Klansmen: Guardians of Liberty, 1926

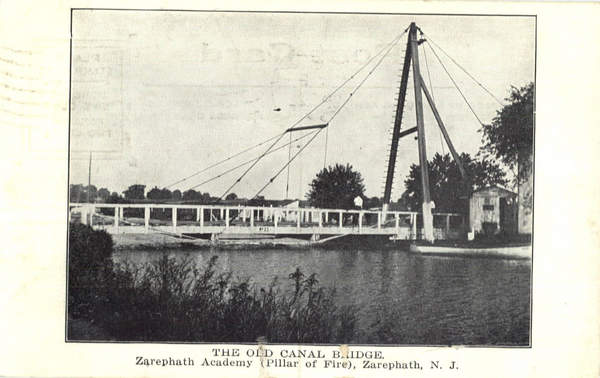
The Old Canal Bridge, Zarephath Academy Zarephath, New Jersey

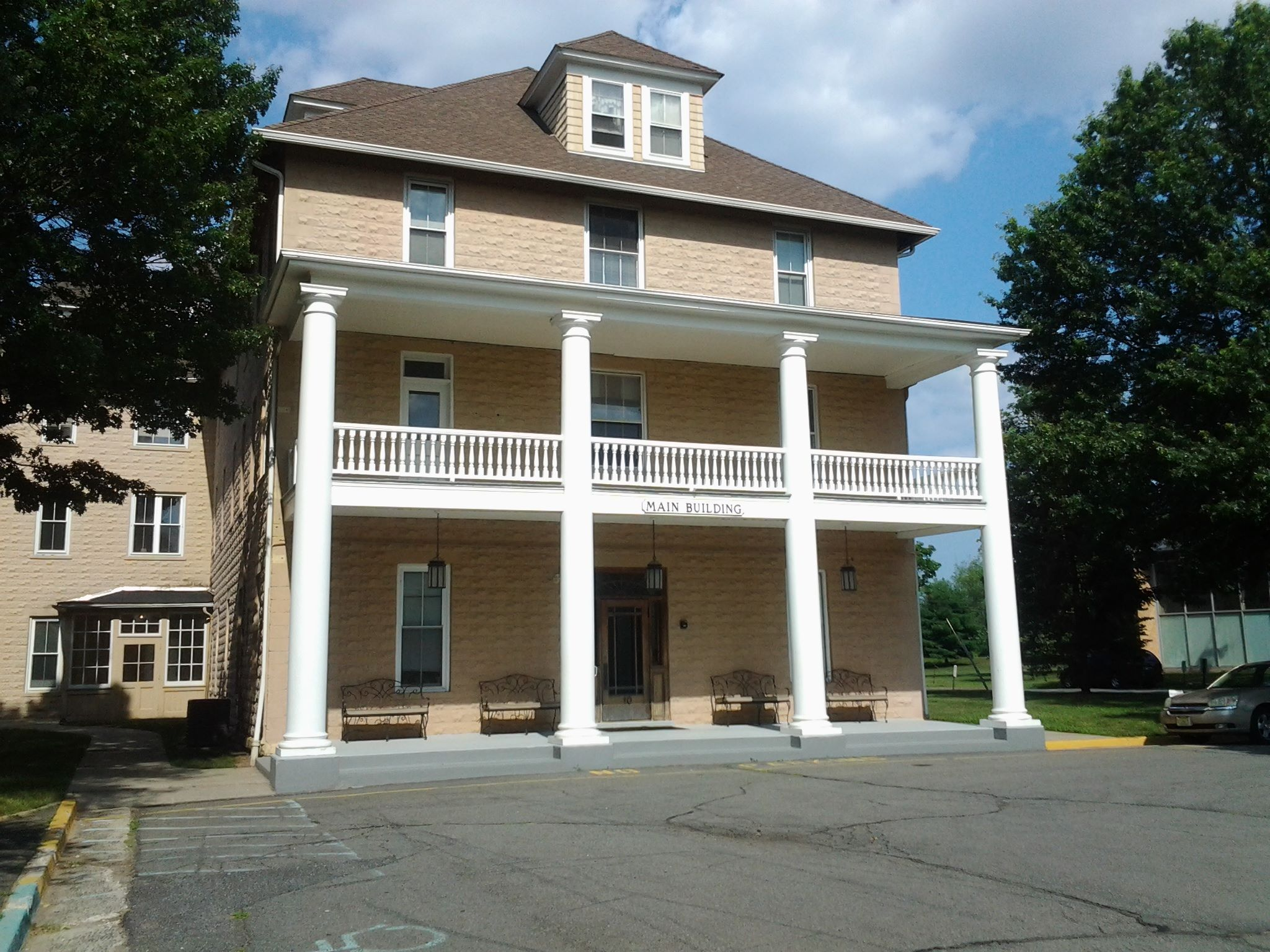
The Main Building in Zarephath, New Jersey, built in the early 1900s, in 2015.

== See also ==
- The Good Citizen
