= Anti-Catholicism =

Discrimination or prejudice towards Catholics

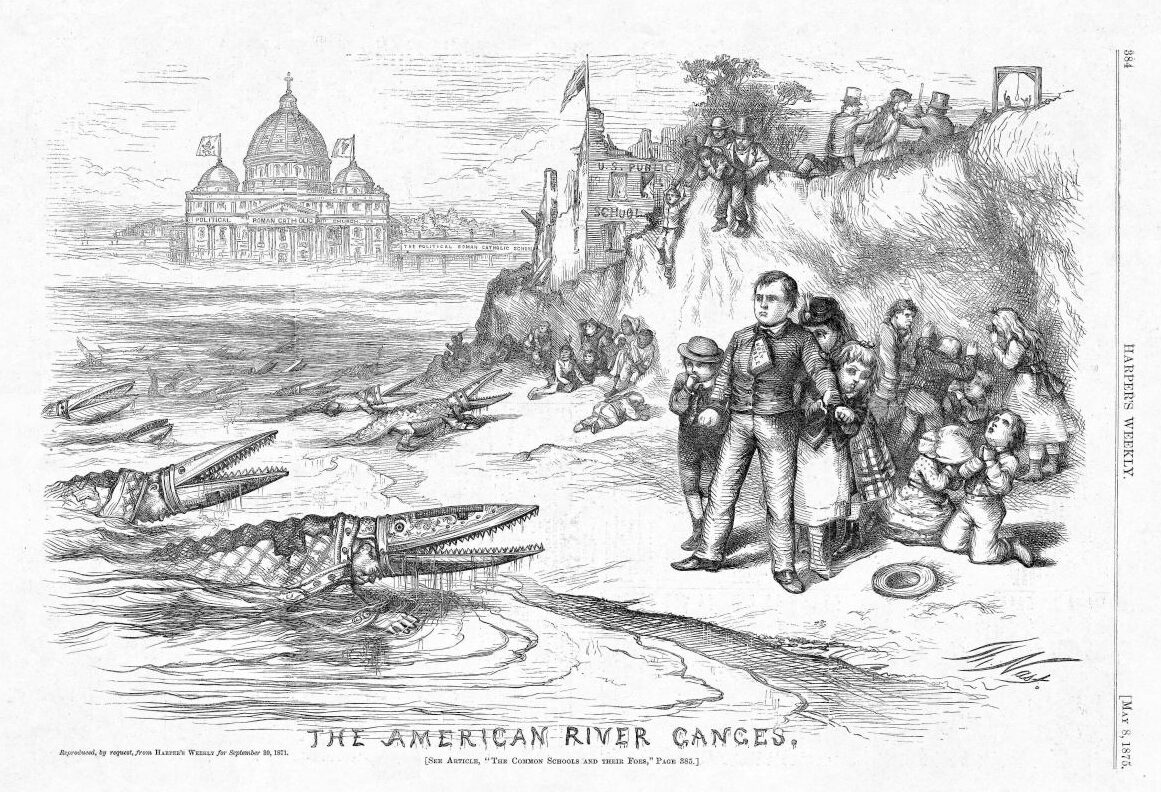
A notable 1875 editorial cartoon by Thomas Nast, a German immigrant to the United States who had been raised as a Catholic. It portrays bishops as crocodiles who are attacking public schools, with the connivance of Irish Catholic politicians. Published in Harper's Weekly, May 8, 1875

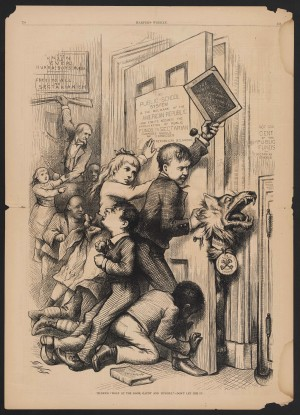
"Wolf at the Door, Gaunt and Hungry. Don't let him in." Thomas Nast cartoon against both Samuel Tilden and the Roman Catholic Church (i.e. if the Democrat Tilden was elected president, the public school system would be "endangered" by the Roman Catholic Church.) Published in Harper's Weekly, September 16, 1876

Anti-Catholicism is prejudice or discrimination against Catholics, including opposition to the Catholic Church, its clergy, the authority of the pope, and its adherents. Four categories of anti-Catholicism exist: political, involving concerns about Catholics' loyalty to the state; theological, rooted in disagreement with Catholic doctrines; popular, including fears and accusations that Catholics are heretics or potential traitors; and sociocultural, based on claims that the Church fosters or enables forms of immorality.

Following the Reformation, a number of majority-Protestant states, including England, Northern Ireland, Prussia and Germany, Scotland, and the United States, at various times incorporated anti-Catholic rhetoric and policies, including opposition to the authority of Catholic clergy (anti-clericalism) and papal authority (anti-papalism), criticism or mockery of Catholic rituals, and religious discrimination and persecution against Catholics.

Several populist movements had anti-Catholic sentiment as a significant component, including segments of Ulster loyalists in Northern Ireland during the Troubles and the second Ku Klux Klan. During the Troubles, some loyalist groups saw perceived links between Catholic communities and apparent Irish republican activity, and Catholics participated in the Northern Ireland Civil Rights Association. The second Ku Klux Klan, led by Imperial Wizard Hiram Wesley Evans, wanted Protestantism to rule supreme and portrayed Catholicism as a threat to the social and political order, with Evans declaring that "Rome shall not rule America."

Historically, Catholics in predominantly Protestant countries were frequently suspected of conspiring and harboring political loyalties to the papacy over loyalty to the state. In majority-Protestant countries that experienced large scale immigration, such as the United States and Australia, suspicion of Catholic immigrants and discrimination against them often overlapped with, or was conflated with, nativist, xenophobic, ethnocentric, and racist sentiments. In the early modern period, anti-clerical governments sought to limit the Catholic Church, including contesting or restricting the pope's authority to appoint bishops, confiscating property, expelling Catholic religious orders, banning forms of Classical Christian education, and establishing state-controlled school systems.

== In primarily Protestant countries ==
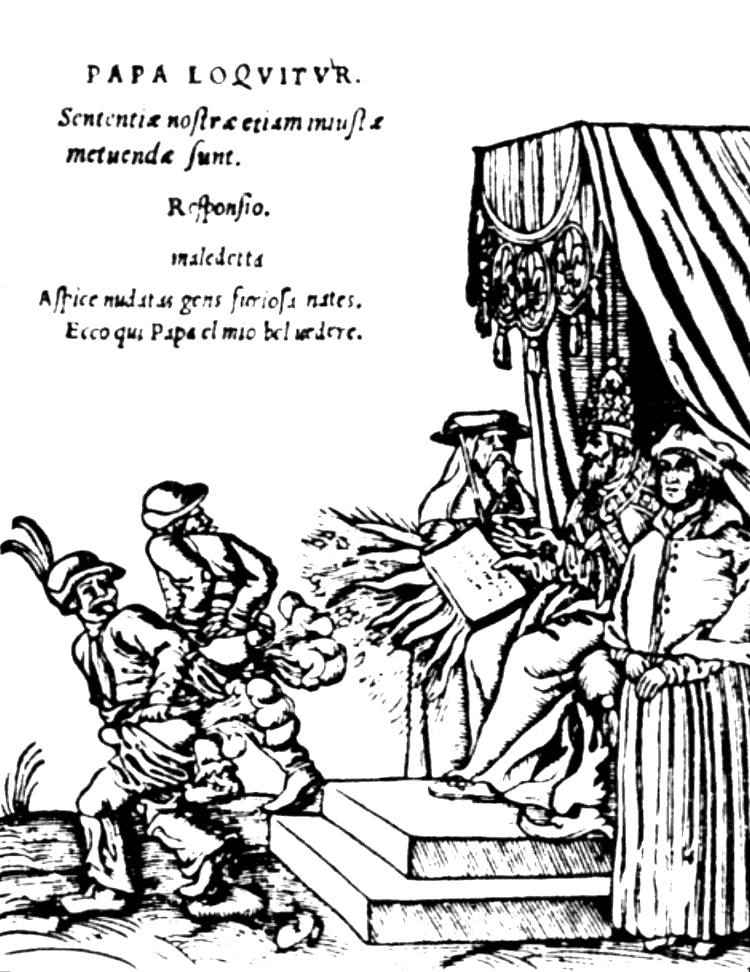
From a series of woodcuts (1545) usually referred to as the Papstspotbilder or Papstspottbilder, by Lucas Cranach, commissioned by Martin Luther. "Kissing the Pope's feet"; German peasants respond to a papal bull of Pope Paul III. Caption reads: "Don't frighten us Pope, with your ban, and don't be such a furious man. Otherwise we shall turn around and show you our rears".

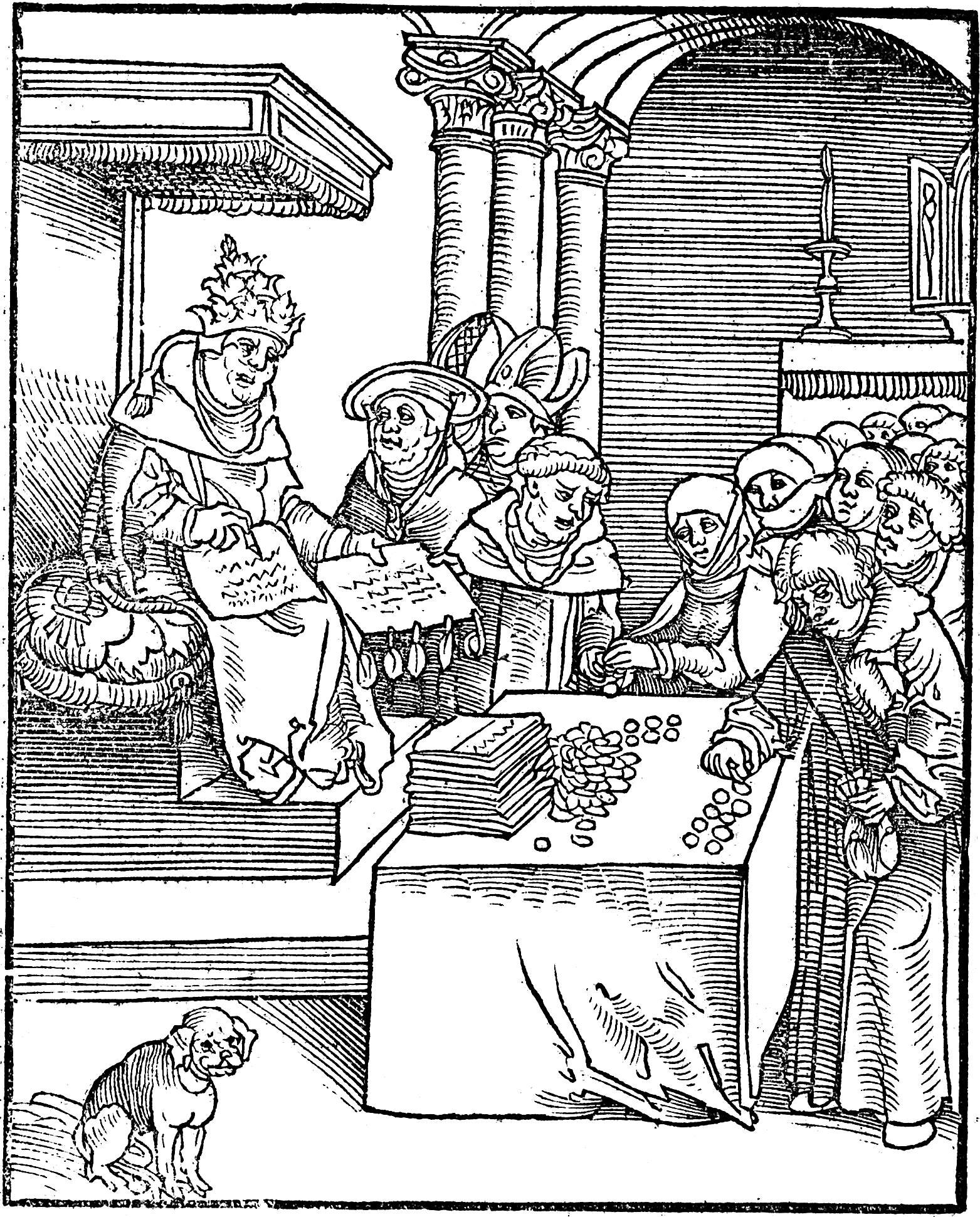
Passional Christi und Antichristi, by Lucas Cranach the Elder, from Luther's 1521 Passionary of the Christ and Antichrist. The Pope as the Antichrist, signing and selling indulgences.

Protestant Reformers, including Martin Luther, John Calvin, John Wycliffe, Henry VIII, Thomas Cranmer, John Thomas, Ellen G. White, John Knox, Charles Taze Russell, Isaac Newton, Roger Williams, Cotton Mather, and John Wesley, along with many other Protestants from the 16th to the 19th centuries, interpreted the Papacy as fulfilling the biblical figure of the Antichrist. The Centuriators of Magdeburg, a group of Lutheran scholars based in Magdeburg and led by Matthias Flacius, produced the twelve-volume Magdeburg Centuries with the aim of challenging papal authority and encouraging other Christians to regard the pope as the Antichrist. The fifth round of talks in the Lutheran–Catholic dialogue notes,

In calling the pope the "Antichrist", the early Lutherans stood in a tradition that reached back into the eleventh century. Not only dissidents and heretics but even saints had called the bishop of Rome the "Antichrist" when they wished to castigate his abuse of power. What Lutherans incorrectly understood as a papal claim to unlimited authority over everything and everyone reminded them of the Apocalyptic imagery of Daniel 11, a passage that had been applied to the pope as the Antichrist of the last days even prior to the Reformation.

Doctrinal works produced by several Protestant traditions, including Lutheran, Reformed, Presbyterian, Baptist, Anabaptist, and Methodist churches, contain references identifying the Pope as the Antichrist. Examples include the Smalcald Articles, Article 4 (1537), the Treatise on the Power and Primacy of the Pope (1537), the Westminster Confession, Article 25.6 (1646), and the 1689 Baptist Confession of Faith, Article 26.4. In 1754, John Wesley published his Explanatory Notes Upon the New Testament, which is now recognized as an official doctrinal standard of the United Methodist Church. In his commentary on Revelation 13, Wesley wrote that "the whole succession of Popes from Gregory VII are undoubtedly Antichrists," while also suggesting that a future pope might be regarded as "more eminently the Antichrist" by exhibiting a "peculiar degree of wickedness from the bottomless pit."

Edward Gibbon, commenting on Protestant interpretations of the Book of Revelation, observed that "the advantage of turning those mysterious prophecies against the See of Rome, inspired the Protestants with uncommon veneration for so useful an ally." Many Protestants also criticized the Catholic discipline of mandatory clerical celibacy, often citing Timothy 4:1 and 4:3, which describe a future time in which some would "forbid people to marry and order them to abstain from certain foods" that "God created to be received with thanksgiving by those who believe and know the truth." In contrast, Catholic teaching presents clerical celibacy as a "sign of new life dedicated to the Lord and to the affairs of the Lord," understood as serving both spiritual and pastoral purposes. Catholic sources further note that Jesus Christ did not marry, that an unmarried priest may find it easier to devote himself fully to pastoral responsibilities, and that celibacy is intended to support a life oriented towards service to others for the purposes of "their salvation and to their sanctification."

During the Enlightenment era, which spanned the seventeenth and eighteenth centuries and emphasized the importance of religious toleration, the Inquisition became a frequent subject of criticism among intellectuals. It was cited as "the most prominent symbol of Catholic religious prosecution."

=== British Empire ===
==== Great Britain ====
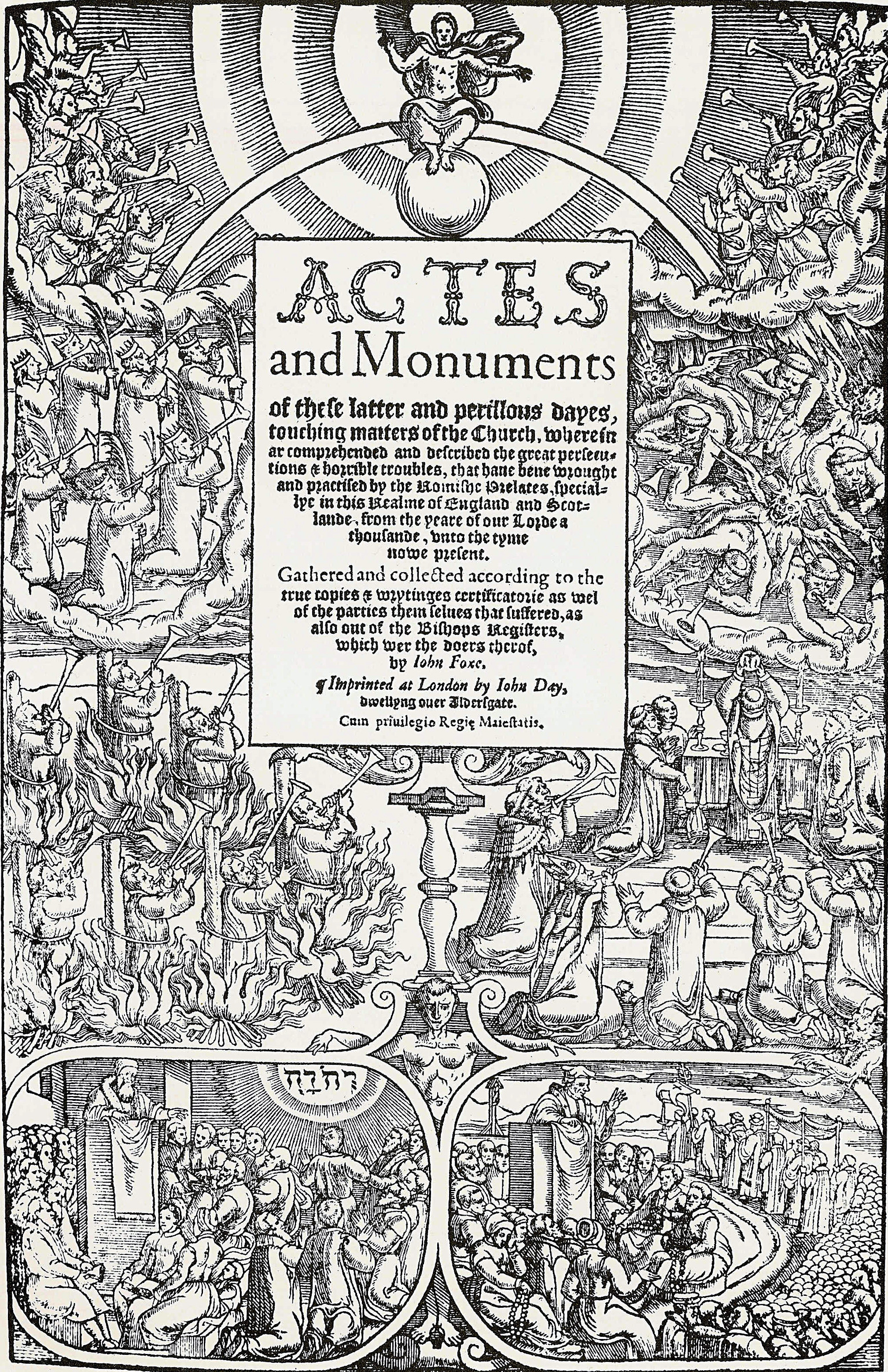
Foxe's Book of Martyrs glorified Protestant martyrs and shaped a lasting negative image of Catholicism in Britain.

Institutional anti-Catholicism in Britain and Ireland developed during the English Reformation under Henry VIII and the Scottish Reformation under John Knox. The Act of Supremacy of 1534 declared the English crown to be "the only supreme head on earth of the Church in England" in place of the pope. Act of allegiances to the papacy were treated as treasonous because the papacy claimed both spiritual and political power over its followers. Under this legislation, Thomas More and John Fisher were executed, and they were later regarded by Catholics as martyrs for their faith.

Mary I, Henry's VIII's daughter, was a committed Catholic. During her reign from 1553 to 1558, she sought to reverse the Reformation, including through her marriage the Catholic king of Spain, Philip II, which was intended to strengthen England's alliance with the Habsburgs, a prominent European Catholic dynasty. Moreover, her government also executed several Protestant leaders. Many Protestants later referred to her as "Bloody Mary".

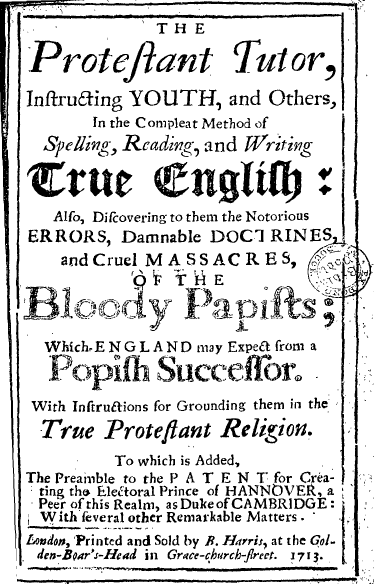
The Protestant Tutor (1713), by Benjamin Harris

Anti-Catholicism among many English and Scottish Protestants was rooted not only in concerns that the pope sought to reassert religious authority over England and Scotland, but also in fears that he might extend secular influence through alliances with France and Spain, both of which were regarded as political adversaries. In 1570, Pope Pius V issued the papal bull Regnans in Excelsis, which declared Elizabeth I a heretic and stated that her subjects were no longer bound to maintain allegiance to her. This declaration rendered subjects who sought to remain loyal to both Elizabeth and the Catholic Church politically suspect and placed Catholic subjects in a difficult position if they attempted to uphold both allegiances simultaneously. The Religion Act 1580 made it a crime of high treason to declare allegiance to a power outside the queen, including any foreign authority. This act was later repealed by section one of the Roman Catholics Act 1844, a measure that some Protestant bishops criticized as "establishing the supremacy of the Pope in the United Kingdom."

Assassination plots in which Catholics played prominent roles contributed to the growth of anti-Catholic sentiment in England. These included the Gunpowder Plot, in which Guy Fawkes and other conspirators attempted to blow up the English Parliament while it was in session. The so-called "Popish Plot," promoted by Titus Oates, was a fabricated conspiracy that that many Protestants nonetheless accepted as genuine, further straining relations between Anglicans and Catholics.

The Glorious Revolution of 1688 to 1689 resulted in the overthrow of King James II of the Stuart dynasty, who was perceived as favoring Catholic interests, and his replacement by a Dutch Protestant ruler. For several decades, the Stuarts received support by France in efforts to regain the throne, and anti-Catholic sentiment continued during this period.

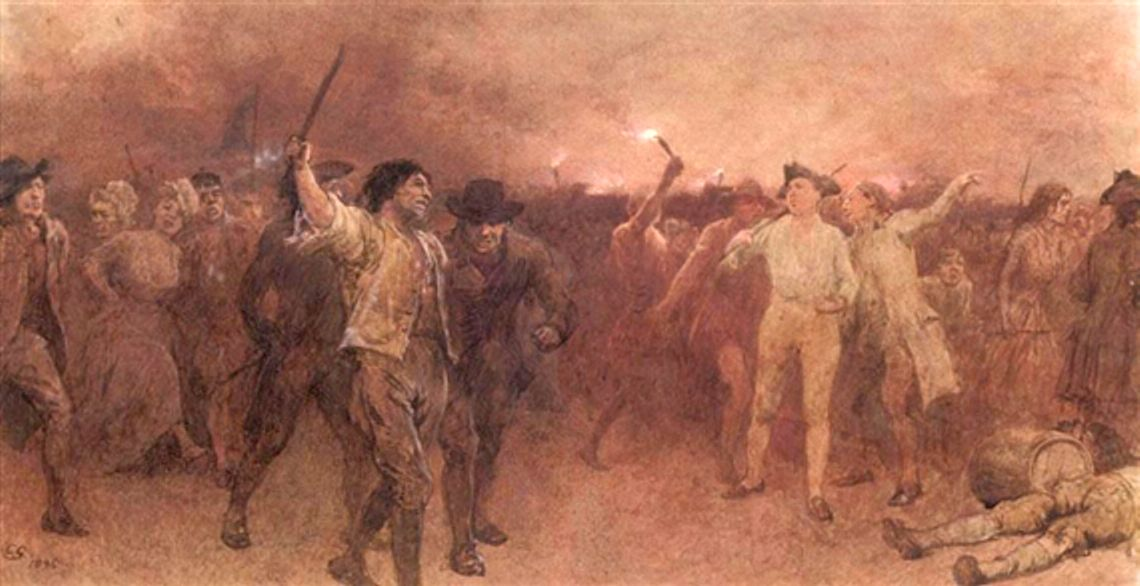
The Gordon Riots, by Charles Green

==== Gordon Riots 1780 ====
The Gordon Riots of 1780 were a series of violent anti-Catholic disturbances in London that arose in response to the Papists Act 1778, which had been enacted by Parliament to reduce some of the legal restrictions imposed on British Catholics by earlier penal laws. Lord George Gordon, leader of the Protestant Association, argued that the act would allow Catholics to serve more freely in the British Army and might encourage disloyalty or treason, and he helped organize a large protest against the legislation. The protest escalated into several days of riots and widespread looting, including attacks on targets such as Catholic chapels, Newgate Prison, and the Bank of England, in what would become some of the most destructive riots in London's history. Local authorities were initially hesitant to intervene decisively, but the disturbances were eventually suppressed only after the army was deployed, resulting in significant loss of life, with contemporary estimates suggesting that several hundred people were killed. The violence, which lasted from 2 June to 9 June 1780, led many members of the middle and upper classes to repudiate both anti-Catholic and popular violence, and it strengthened support for the government of Lord North; in the longer term, the riots also contributed to arguments in favor of creating a more formal, organized system of policing in London.

==== 19th century ====
Anglo-French conflicts during the French Revolutionary and Napoleonic Wars, which occurred between 1793 and 1815, contributed to the expansion of anti-Catholic sentiment as part of broader efforts to strengthen support among Protestant populations in England, Scotland, and Wales. Hostility toward Catholicism circulated across social classes and became increasingly intertwined with emerging forms of British national identity. Historian Linda Colley argues in Britons: Forging of a Nation 1707–1837 that the "defensive unity brought on by war with a Catholic French 'other' helped transform Great Britain from a new and largely artificial polity into a nation with a strong self-image rooted in Protestantism."

In Ireland, Catholics gained the right to vote in the 1790s, although they remained largely excluded from meaningful political influence for several decades. The situation shifted when Daniel O'Connell, founder of the Catholic Association, organized Catholic voters into effective electoral majorities in many Irish parliamentary constituencies. Catholics could elect representatives, but they were still prohibited from taking their seats in Parliament, which created a major constitutional and political conflict known as the Catholic emancipation crisis. Political leaders who had previously opposed Catholic participation, including the Duke of Wellington and Robert Peel, eventually supported legislative reform in an effort to avoid widespread unrest. The Roman Catholic Relief Act 1829 granted Catholics in Britain and Ireland the right to sit in Parliament and removed most of the remaining legal restrictions they faced, including the requirement to take certain sacramental tests and oaths; however, despite these reforms, anti-Catholic attitudes persisted in various parts of British society.

==== Early 20th century ====
In 1937, ten young men and boys, aged from 13 to 23, burned to death in a fire on a farm in Kirkintilloch, Scotland. All were seasonal workers from Achill Sound in County Mayo, Ireland. The Vanguard, the official newspaper of the Scottish Protestant League, referred to the event in the following text:

The Scandal of Kirkintilloch is not that some Irishmen have lost their lives in a fire; it is that Irish Papists brought up in disloyalty and superstition are engaged in jobs which should belong by right to Scottish Protestants.

The Kirkintilloch sensation again reminds the People of Scotland that Rome's Irish Scum still over-run our land.

==== Since 1945 ====
Since World War II, anti-Catholic feeling in England, Scotland and Wales has abated somewhat. Ecumenical dialogue between Anglicans and Catholics culminated in the first meeting between an Archbishop of Canterbury and a Pope since the Reformation when Archbishop Geoffrey Fisher visited Rome in 1960. Since then, the dialogue has continued through envoys and standing conferences. Meanwhile, the nonconformist churches such as the Methodists, the Church of Scotland, and the established Church of England, have all dramatically declined in membership. Membership in the Catholic Church continues to grow in Britain, thanks to the immigration of Irish and more recently, the immigration of Polish workers.

Conflict and rivalry between Catholicism and Protestantism since the 1920s, especially since the 1960s, has centered on the Troubles in Northern Ireland.

Anti-Catholicism in Britain was long represented by the burning of an effigy of the Catholic conspirator Guy Fawkes during widespread celebrations of Guy Fawkes Night every 5 November. However, this celebration has lost most of its anti-Catholic connotations. According to Clive D. Field, only faint remnants of anti-Catholicism are found today.

==== Ireland ====
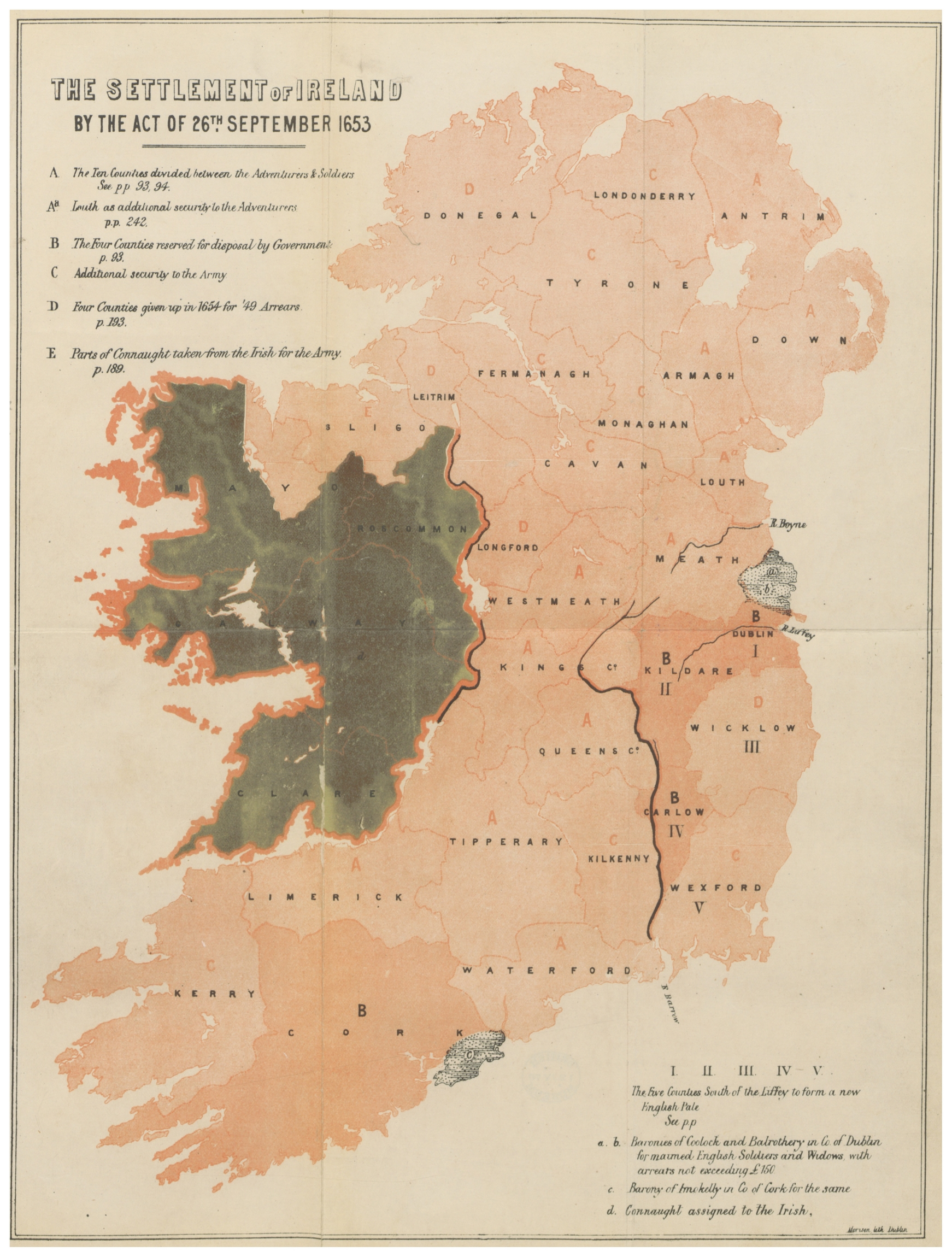
After the Cromwellian conquest of Ireland, huge areas of land were confiscated and the Irish Catholics were banished to the lands of Connacht.

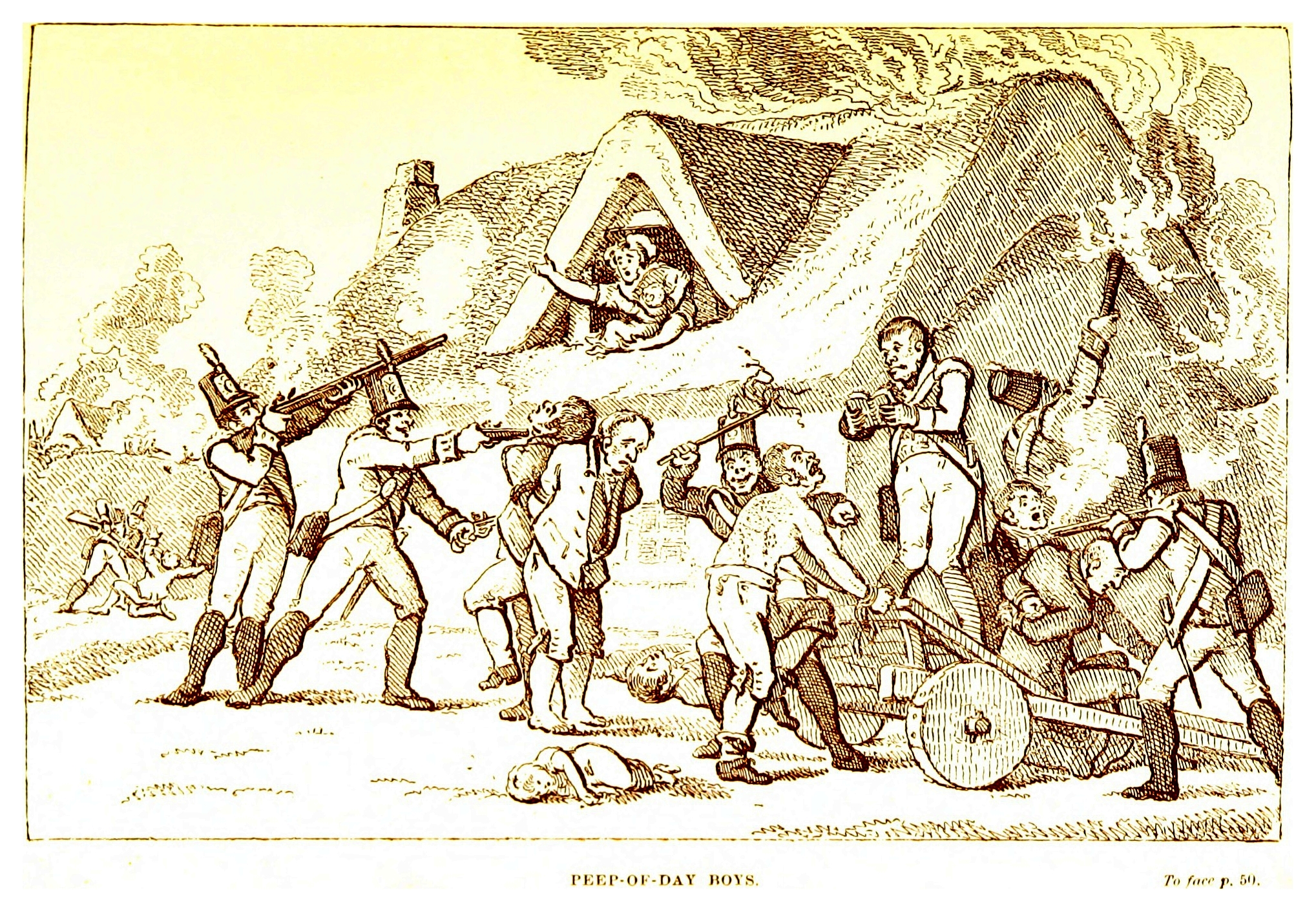
An illustration of the anti-Catholic Peep o' Day Boys association

As punishment for the rebellion of 1641, almost all of the lands which were owned by Irish Catholics were confiscated and given to Protestant settlers. Under the Penal Laws, no Irish Catholic could sit in the Parliament of Ireland, even though some 90% of Ireland's population was native Irish Catholic when the first of these bans was introduced in 1691. Tensions between Irish Catholics and Protestants have been blamed for much of "The Troubles".

During the 18th century, the Peep o' Day Boys, an agrarian association composed of Irish Protestants, engaged in numerous acts of anti-Catholic violence through County Armagh. These acts culminated in the Armagh disturbances, a period of intense sectarian conflict during the 1780's and 1790's between the Peep o' Day Boys and the Catholic Defenders. The Peep o' Day Boys would conduct early morning raids on Catholic homes to confiscate weapons, which Irish Catholics were forbidden from owning under the Penal Laws. This led to confrontations between them and the Defenders, which culminated in the Battle of the Diamond, a confrontation which saw six killed and many more wounded. Though the Orange Order would denounce the actions of the Peep o' Day Boys, further anti-Catholic violence would continue to erupt in Ireland in the years leading up the Irish Rebellion of 1798.

===== Laws which restricted the rights of Irish Catholics =====
The Great Famine of Ireland was exacerbated by the imposition of anti-Catholic laws. In the 17th and 18th centuries, the penal laws prohibited Irish Catholics from either purchasing or leasing land, from voting, from holding political office, from living either within 5 miles (8 km) away from a corporate town, from obtaining an education, from entering a profession, and doing many of the other things which a person needed to do in order to succeed and prosper in society. The laws were largely reformed under the Roman Catholic Relief Act 1793, and Catholics could again sit in parliament following the Roman Catholic Relief Act 1829.

==== Northern Ireland ====
Northern Ireland came into existence in 1921, following the Government of Ireland Act 1920. Though Catholics were a majority on the island of Ireland, comprising 74% of the population in 1911, they were a third of the population in Northern Ireland.

In 1934, Sir James Craig, the first Prime Minister of Northern Ireland, said, "Since we took up office we have tried to be absolutely fair towards all the citizens of Northern Ireland... They still boast of Southern Ireland being a Catholic State. All I boast of is that we are a Protestant Parliament and a Protestant State."

In 1957, Harry Midgley, the Minister of Education in Northern Ireland, said, in Portadown Orange Hall, "All the minority are traitors and have always been traitors to the Government of Northern Ireland."

The first Catholic to be appointed a minister in Northern Ireland was Gerard Newe, in 1971.

In 1986, at the annual conference of the Democratic Unionist Party, MP for Mid Ulster William McCrea interrupted councillor Ethel Smyth when she said she regretted the death of Sean Downes, a 24-year-old Catholic civilian who had been killed by a plastic bullet fired by the RUC during an anti-internment march in Andersonstown in 1984. McCrea shouted, "No. No. I'll not condemn the death of John Downes [sic]. No Fenian. Never. No". In Northern Ireland and Scotland, Fenian is used by some as a derogatory word for Roman Catholics.

In 2001 and 2002, the Holy Cross dispute occurred in the Ardoyne area of north Belfast. The Holy Cross school, a Catholic primary school for girls, is situated in the middle of a Protestant area. In June 2001—during the last week of school before the summer break—Protestant loyalists began picketing the school, claiming that Catholics were regularly attacking their homes and denying them access to facilities. The picket resumed on 3 September, when the new school term began. For weeks, hundreds of loyalist protesters tried to stop the schoolchildren and their parents from walking to school through their area. Hundreds of riot police, backed up by British soldiers, escorted the children and parents through the protest each day. Some protesters shouted sectarian abuse and threw stones, bricks, fireworks, blast bombs and urine-filled balloons at the schoolchildren, their parents and the RUC. The "scenes of frightened Catholic schoolgirls running a gauntlet of abuse from loyalist protesters as they walked to school captured world headlines". Death threats were made against the parents and school staff by the Red Hand Defenders, a loyalist paramilitary group.

Eleventh Night is a yearly celebration where Ulster Protestants burn bonfires often adorned with pictures of Irish Catholic politicians, Irish tricolours and effigies of Catholics. Sometimes the tricolours have sectarian dispays as "KAI" (Kill all Irish) or "KAT" (Kill all Taigs) written on them. In 2025 a bonfire had an effigy of a migrant boat with the phrase "Stop the Boats" written on a sign beneath it, as well as the Irish Tricolours.

==== Canada ====
Fears of the Catholic Church were quite strong in the 19th century, especially among Presbyterian and other Protestant Irish immigrants across Canada.

In 1853, the Gavazzi Riots left 10 dead in Quebec in the wake of Catholic Irish protests against anti-Catholic speeches by ex-monk Alessandro Gavazzi. The most influential newspaper in Canada, The Globe of Toronto, was edited by George Brown, a Presbyterian immigrant from Ireland who ridiculed and denounced the Catholic Church, Jesuits, priests, nunneries, etc. Irish Protestants remained a political force until the 20th century. Many belonged to the Orange Order, an anti-Catholic organization with chapters across Canada that was most powerful during the late 19th century.

A key leader was Dalton McCarthy (1836–1898), a Protestant who had immigrated from Ireland. In the late 19th century he mobilized the "Orange" or Protestant Irish, and fiercely fought against Irish Catholics as well as the French Catholics. He especially crusaded for the abolition of the French language in Manitoba and Ontario schools.

In response to the 2021 Canadian Indian residential school gravesite discoveries, numerous churches and monuments in Western Canada have been vandalized or burned down.

==== French language schools in Canada ====
One of the most controversial issues was public support for Catholic French-language schools. Although the Confederation Agreement of 1867 guaranteed the status of Catholic schools when they were legalized by provincial governments, disputes erupted in numerous provinces, especially in the Manitoba Schools Question in the 1890s and in Ontario in the 1910s. In Ontario, Regulation 17 was a regulation by the Ontario Ministry of Education that restricted the use of French as a language of instruction to the first two years of schooling. French Canada reacted vehemently and lost, dooming its French-language Catholic schools. This was a central reason for French Canada's distance from the World War I effort, as its young men refused to enlist.

Protestant elements succeeded in blocking the growth of French-language Catholic public schools. However, the Irish Catholics generally supported the English language position which was advocated by the Protestants.

==== Newfoundland ====
Newfoundland long experienced social and political tensions between the large Irish Catholic working-class, on the one hand and the Anglican elite on the other. In the 1850s, the Catholic bishop organized his flock and made them stalwarts of the Liberal party. Nasty rhetoric was the prevailing style elections; bloody riots were common during the 1861 election. The Protestants narrowly elected Hugh Hoyles as the Conservative premier. Hoyles unexpectedly reversed his long record of militant Protestant activism and worked to defuse tensions. He shared patronage and power with the Catholics; all jobs and patronage were split between the various religious bodies on a per capita basis. This 'denominational compromise' was further extended to education when all religious schools were put on the basis which the Catholics had enjoyed since the 1840s. Alone in North America Newfoundland had a state funded system of denominational schools. The compromise worked and politics ceased to be about religion and became concerned with purely political and economic issues.

==== Australia ====
The presence of Catholicism in Australia came with the 1788 arrival of the First Fleet of British convict ships at Sydney. The colonial authorities blocked a Catholic clerical presence until 1820, reflecting the legal disabilities of Catholics in Britain. Some of the Irish convicts had been transported to Australia for political crimes or social rebellion and authorities remained suspicious of the minority religion.

Catholic convicts were compelled to attend Church of England services and their children and orphans were raised as Anglicans. The first Catholic priests to arrive came as convicts following the Irish 1798 Rebellion. In 1803, Fr James Dixon was conditionally emancipated and permitted to celebrate Mass, but following the Irish led Castle Hill Rebellion of 1804, Dixon's permission was revoked. Fr Jeremiah Flynn, an Irish Cistercian, was appointed as Prefect Apostolic of New Holland and set out uninvited from Britain for the colony. Watched by authorities, Flynn secretly performed priestly duties before being arrested and deported to London. Reaction to the affair in Britain led to two further priests being allowed to travel to the colony in 1820. The Church of England was disestablished in the Colony of New South Wales by the Church Act of 1836. Drafted by the Catholic attorney-general John Plunkett, the act established legal equality for Anglicans, Catholics and Presbyterians and was later extended to Methodists.

By the late 19th century approximately a quarter of the population of Australia were Irish Australians. Many were descended from the 40,000 Irish Catholics who were transported as convicts to Australia before 1867. The majority consisted of British and Irish Protestants. The Catholics dominated the labour unions and the Labor Party. The growth of school systems in the late 19th century typically involved religious issues, pitting Protestants against Catholics. The issue of independence for Ireland was long a sore point, until the matter was resolved by the Irish War of Independence.

Limited freedom of belief is protected by Section 116 of the Constitution of Australia, but sectarianism in Australia was prominent (though generally nonviolent) in the 20th century, flaring during the First World War, again reflecting Ireland's place within the Empire, and the Catholic minority remained subject to discrimination and suspicion. During the First World War, the Irish gave support for the war effort and comprised 20% of the army in France. However, the labour unions and the Irish in particular, strongly opposed conscription, and in alliance with like-minded farmers, defeated it in national plebiscites in 1916 and 1917. The Anglicans in particular talked of Catholic "disloyalty". By the 1920s, Australia had its first Catholic prime minister.

During the 1950s, the split in the Australian Labor Party between allies and opponents of the Catholic anti-Communist B. A. Santamaria meant that the party (in Victoria and Queensland more than elsewhere) was effectively divided between pro-Catholic and anti-Catholic elements. As a result of such disunity the ALP was defeated at every single national election between 1955 and 1972. In the late 20th century, the Catholic Church replaced the Anglican Church as the largest single Christian body in Australia; and it continues to be so in the 21st century, although it still has fewer members than do the various Protestant churches combined.

While older sectarian divides declined, commentators have observed a re-emergence of anti-Catholicism in Australia in recent decades amid rising secularism and broader anti-Christian movements.

==== New Zealand ====
According to New Zealand historian Michael King, the situation in New Zealand has never been as clear as in Australia. Catholics first arrived in New Zealand in 1769, and the Church has had a continuous presence in the country from the time of permanent settlement by Irish Catholics in the 1820s, with the first Maori converted to Catholicism in the 1830s. The signing of the Treaty of Waitangi in 1840, which formalised New Zealand's status as a British colony and instigated substantial immigration from England and Scotland, resulted in the country developing a predominantly Protestant religious character. Nonetheless, French bishop Jean Baptiste Pompallier was able to negotiate the inclusion of a clause guaranteeing freedom of religion in some of the versions of the treaties signed and oral promises during meetings beforehand.

New Zealand has had several Catholic prime ministers, which is indicative of the widespread acceptance of Catholicism within the country; Jim Bolger, who lead the Fourth National Government of the 1990s, was the country's fourth Catholic prime minister; Bill English, who lead the Fifth National Government from 2016 to 2017, was the fifth and most recent. Probably the most notable of New Zealand's Catholic prime ministers was Michael Joseph Savage, an Australian-born trade unionist and social reformer who instigated numerous progressive policies as leader of the First Labour Government of the 1930s.

=== German Empire ===
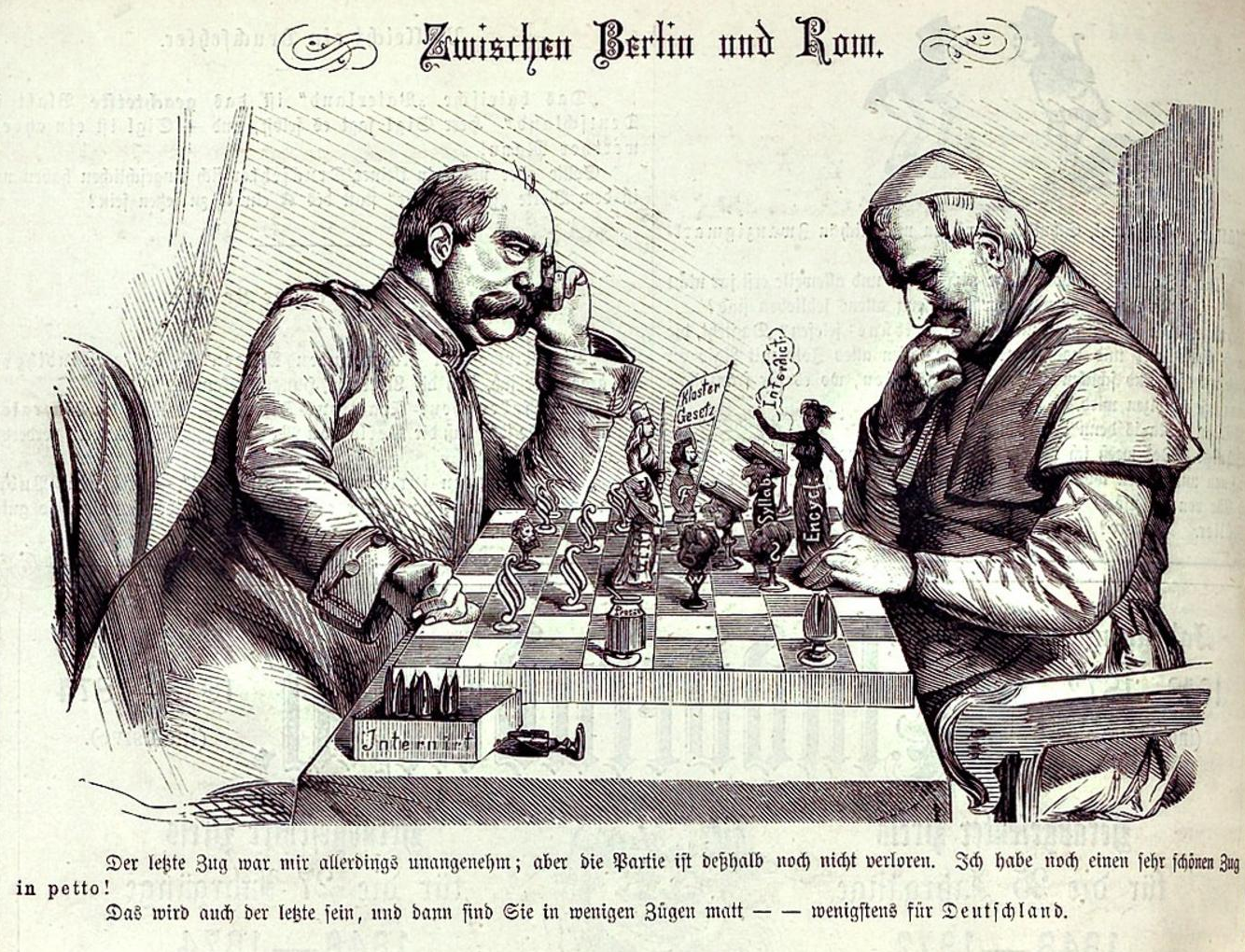
Between Berlin and Rome. Bismarck (left) confronts Pope Pius IX, 1875.

Unification into the German Empire in 1871 saw a country with a Protestant majority and large Catholic minority, speaking German or Polish. Anti-Catholicism was common. The powerful German Chancellor Otto von Bismarck – a devout Lutheran – forged an alliance with secular liberals in 1871–1878 to launch a Kulturkampf (literally, "culture struggle") especially in Prussia, the largest state in the new German Empire to destroy the political power of the Catholic Church and the Pope. Catholics were numerous in the South (Bavaria, Baden-Wuerttemberg) and west (Rhineland) and fought back. Bismarck intended to end Catholics' loyalty with Rome (ultramontanism) and subordinate all Germans to the power of his state.

Priests and bishops who resisted the Kulturkampf were arrested or removed from their positions. By the height of anti-Catholic legislation, half of the Prussian bishops were in prison or in exile, a quarter of the parishes had no priest, half the monks and nuns had left Prussia, a third of the monasteries and convents were closed, 1800 parish priests were imprisoned or exiled, and thousands of laymen were imprisoned for helping the priests. There were anti-Polish elements in Greater Poland and Silesia. The Catholics refused to comply; they strengthened their Centre Party.

Pius IX died in 1878 and was replaced by more conciliatory Pope Leo XIII who negotiated away most of the anti-Catholic laws beginning in 1880. Bismarck himself broke with the anti-Catholic Liberals and worked with the Catholic Centre Party to fight Socialism. Pope Leo officially declared the end of the Kulturkampf on 23 May 1887.

==== Nazi Germany ====
The Catholic Church faced repression in Nazi Germany (1933–1945). Hitler despised the Church even though he had been brought up in a Catholic home. The long-term aim of many Nazis was the de-Christianization of Germany and the establishment of a form of Germanic paganism which would replace Christianity. however Richard J. Evans writes that Hitler believed that in the long run National Socialism and religion would not be able to co-exist, stressing repeatedly that Nazism was a secular ideology, founded on modern science: "Science, he declared, would easily destroy the last remaining vestiges of superstition". Germany could not tolerate the intervention of foreign influences such as the Pope and "Priests, he said, were 'black bugs', 'abortions in black cassocks'". Nazi ideology desired the subordination of the Church to the State and could not accept an autonomous establishment, whose legitimacy did not spring from the government. From the beginning, the Catholic Church faced general persecution, regimentation and oppression. Aggressive anti-Church radicals like Alfred Rosenberg and Martin Bormann saw the conflict with the Churches as a priority concern, and anti-Church and anti-clerical sentiments were strong among grassroots party activists. To many Nazis, Catholics were suspected of insufficient patriotism, or even of disloyalty to the Fatherland, and of serving the interests of "sinister alien forces".

Adolf Hitler had some regard for the organisational power of Catholicism, but towards its teachings he showed nothing but the sharpest hostility, calling them "the systematic cultivation of the human failure": To Hitler, Christianity was a religion that was only fit for slaves and he detested its ethics. Alan Bullock wrote: "Its teaching, he declared, was a rebellion against the natural law of selection by struggle and the survival of the fittest". For political reasons, Hitler was prepared to restrain his anti-clericalism, seeing danger in strengthening the Church by persecuting it, but he intended to wage a show-down against it after the war. Joseph Goebbels, the Minister for Propaganda, led the Nazi persecution of the Catholic clergy and wrote that there was "an insoluble opposition between the Christian and a heroic-German world view". Hitler's chosen deputy, Martin Bormann, was a rigid guardian of Nazi orthodoxy and saw Christianity and Nazism as "incompatible", as did the official Nazi philosopher, Alfred Rosenberg, who wrote in Myth of the Twentieth Century (1930) that the Catholic Church were among the chief enemies of the Germans. In 1934, the Sanctum Officium put Rosenberg's book on the Index Librorum Prohibitorum (forbidden books list of the Church) for scorning and rejecting "all dogmas of the Catholic Church, indeed the very fundamentals of the Christian religion".

The Nazis claimed that they had jurisdiction over all collective and social activities and based on their claim, they infiltrated all collective and social institutions, interfered in all of the activities which they performed, and banned them if they did not become Nazified, including Catholic schools, youth groups, workers' clubs and cultural societies. Hitler moved quickly to eliminate Political Catholicism, rounding up members of the Catholic aligned Bavarian People's Party and Catholic Centre Party, which ceased to exist in early July 1933. Vice Chancellor Papen meanwhile, amid continuing molestation of Catholic clergy and organisations, negotiated a Reich concordat with the Holy See, which prohibited clergy from participating in politics. Hitler then proceeded to close all Catholic institutions whose functions were not strictly religious:

It quickly became clear that [Hitler] intended to imprison the Catholics, as it were, in their own churches. They could celebrate Mass and retain their rituals as much as they liked, but they could have nothing at all to do with German society otherwise. Catholic schools and newspapers were closed, and a propaganda campaign against the church was launched.

— Extract from An Honourable Defeat by Anton Gill

Almost immediately after agreeing the Concordat, the Nazis promulgated their sterilization law, an offensive policy in the eyes of the Catholic Church and moved to dissolve the Catholic Youth League. Clergy, nuns and lay leaders began to be targeted, leading to thousands of arrests over the ensuing years, often on trumped up charges of currency smuggling or "immorality". In Hitler's Night of the Long Knives purge, Erich Klausener, the head of Catholic Action, was assassinated. Adalbert Probst, national director of the Catholic Youth Sports Association, Fritz Gerlich, editor of Munich's Catholic weekly and Edgar Jung, one of the authors of the Marburg speech, were among the other Catholic opposition figures killed in the purge.

By 1937, the Church hierarchy in Germany, which had initially attempted to co-operate with the new government, had become highly disillusioned. In March, Pope Pius XI issued the Mit brennender Sorge encyclical – accusing the Nazis of violations of the Concordat, and of sowing the "tares of suspicion, discord, hatred, calumny, of secret and open fundamental hostility to Christ and His Church". The Pope noted on the horizon the "threatening storm clouds" of religious wars of extermination over Germany. The Nazis responded with, an intensification of the Church Struggle. There were mass arrests of clergy and Church presses were expropriated. Goebbels renewed the regime's crackdown and propaganda against Catholics. By 1939 all Catholic denominational schools had been disbanded or converted to public facilities. By 1941, all Church press had been banned.

Later Catholic protests included the 22 March 1942 pastoral letter by the German bishops on "The Struggle against Christianity and the Church". About 30 per cent of Catholic priests were disciplined by police during the Nazi era. In effort to counter the strength and influence of spiritual resistance, the security services monitored Catholic clergy very closely – instructing that agents monitor every diocese, that the bishops' reports to the Vatican should be obtained and that bishops' activities be discovered and reported. Priests were frequently denounced, arrested, or sent to concentration camps – many to the dedicated clergy barracks at Dachau. Of a total of 2,720 clergy imprisoned at Dachau, some 2,579 (or 95%) were Catholic. Nazi policy towards the Church was at its most severe in the territories it annexed to Greater Germany, where the Nazis set about systematically dismantling the Church – arresting its leaders, exiling its clergymen, closing its churches, monasteries and convents. Many clergymen were murdered.

=== Netherlands ===
The independence of the Netherlands from Spanish rule led to the formation of a majority Protestant country in which the dominant form of Protestantism was Calvinism. In Amsterdam, Catholic priests were driven out of the city and following the Dutch takeover, all Catholic churches were converted into Protestant churches. Amsterdam's relationship with the Catholic Church was not normalised until the 20th century.

Religion was one reason leading to the Belgian Revolution of 1830, during which the mainly-Catholic southern provinces seceded from the United Kingdom of the Netherlands. The de facto secession was not recognised by the King William I of the Netherlands. Subsequently, the Treaty of London, in 1839, recognised the new state, and the predominantly-Catholic Kingdom of Belgium came into being. The remnant Kingdom of the Netherlands remained predominantly Protestant.

=== Nordic countries ===
==== Norway ====
After the dissolution of Denmark-Norway in 1814, the new Norwegian Constitution of 1814, did not grant religious freedom, as it stated that both Jews and Jesuits were denied entrance to the Kingdom of Norway. It also stated that attendance in a Lutheran church was compulsory, effectively banning Catholics. The ban on Catholicism was lifted in 1842, and the ban on Jews was lifted in 1851. At first, there were multiple restrictions on the practice of Catholicism by Norwegians and only foreign citizens were freely allowed to practice it. The first post-reformation parish was founded in 1843, Catholics were only allowed to celebrate Mass in this one parish. In 1845 most of the restrictions on the practice of non-Lutheran Christianity were lifted, and Catholics were now allowed to freely practice their religion, but Monasticism and the Jesuits were not allowed in the country until 1897 and 1956 respectively.

==== Sweden ====
During the period of great power in Sweden, conversions to Catholicism were punished with fines or imprisonment and in exceptional cases, death. Sweden during the Thirty Years War saw itself as the protector of Protestantism in all of Europe against the pope. The Linköping Bloodbath of 20 March 1600 saw several prominent Catholic nobles beheaded by order of King Charles IX of Sweden. The executions were partially motivated by the threat of a potential Catholic takeover under king Sigismund III Vasa, who planned to reconvert Sweden back to Catholicism. The Battle of Stångebro prevented Sigismund, who had been king of Sweden from 1592-1599 and also king of Poland, from regaining his crown and reconverting Sweden. Catholic nobles were previously put in a majority of leading positions by Sigismund In the Swedish government without the approval of the Swedish people or parliament. The conspiracy provoked new laws preventing Catholics from holding leading government positions in the Swedish government. Due to the Austrian emperor winning a lot of great victories before Sweden joined. The war and Swedish successes cemented Protestantism's continued survival in the Holy Roman Empire and the following anti-Catholicism ingrained in the religion.

Gustavus Adolphus of Sweden was known as the "Lion from the North". He did prevent the pillaging of Catholic villages of Swedish troops by proclaiming Protestant moral superiority in 1631, while Catholic armies were plundering Saxony. He did not wear any armour during the Battle of Rain against the Catholics and proclaimed he was divinely chosen by God to lead the Protestants to glory, and so felt he needed no protection in battle. Russian Orthodox populations had the right to practice their faith since their incorporation in 1617 after the Ingrian War and never faced similar persecution. Even after Eastern Orthodoxy was legalized, there remained an extreme anti-Catholic sentiment in Sweden which was widely supported by German nobility and German Protestants in Swedish territories.

Only in 1781 did Catholics have the right to worship once again in Sweden, the latest of all major religions except Judaism that was legalized in the same era, even though Judaism had already been in practice tolerated since Charles XII of Sweden brought Muslim and Jewish advisors with him from the Ottoman Empire. While Protestant Swedes could not join any other religious organization until 1873, still, in 1849, Catholic converts were punished with imprisonment. Conversion to Catholicism was punished with fines or imprisonment even after the reform. Catholics could not become a minister of the Swedish government or work as teachers or nurses in Sweden until 1951.

=== United States ===
John Higham described anti-Catholicism as "the most luxuriant, tenacious tradition of paranoiac agitation in American history."

- Jenkins, Philip. The New Anti-Catholicism: The Last Acceptable Prejudice (Oxford University Press, New ed. 2004). British anti-Catholicism was exported to the United States. Two types of anti-Catholic rhetoric existed in colonial society. The first, which was derived from the heritage of the Protestant Reformation and the religious wars of the sixteenth century, consisted of the "Anti-Christ" and the "Whore of Babylon" variety and it dominated Anti-Catholic thought until the late seventeenth century. The second was a more secular variety which focused on the supposed intrigue of the Catholics and accused them of plotting to extend medieval despotism worldwide.

Historian Arthur Schlesinger Sr. has called anti-Catholicism "the deepest-held bias in the history of the American people".

Historian Joseph G. Mannard says that wars reduced anti-Catholicism: "enough Catholics supported the War for Independence to erase many old myths about the inherently treasonable nature of Catholicism.... During the Civil War the heavy enlistments of Irish and Germans into the Union Army helped to dispel notions of immigrant and Catholic disloyalty."

==== Colonial era ====
American anti-Catholicism has its origins in the Protestant Reformation which generated anti-Catholic propaganda for various political and dynastic reasons. Because the Protestant Reformation justified itself as an effort to correct what it perceived were the errors and the excesses of the Catholic Church, it formed strong positions against the Catholic bishops and the Papacy in particular. These positions were brought to New England by English colonists who were predominantly Puritans. They opposed not only the Catholic Church but also the Church of England which, due to its perpetuation of some Catholic doctrines and practices, was deemed insufficiently "reformed". Furthermore, English and Scottish identity to a large extent was based on opposition to Catholicism. "To be English was to be anti-Catholic," writes Robert Curran.

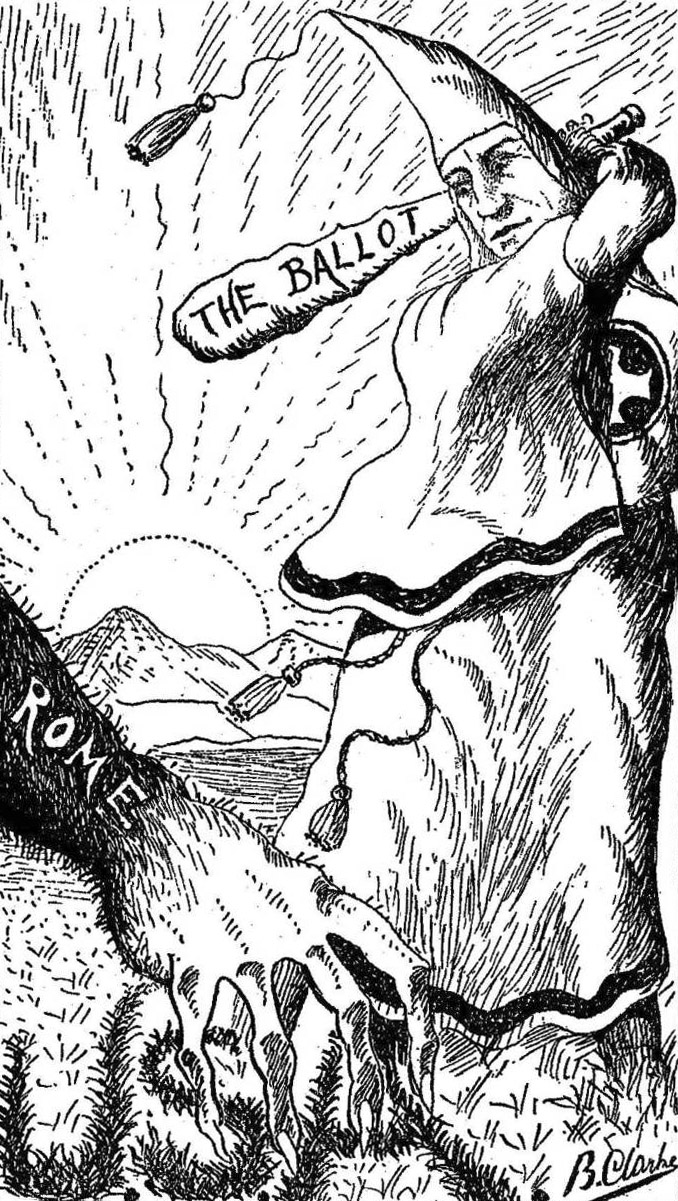
Rev. Branford Clarke illustration in the Ku Klux Klan, Heroes of the Fiery Cross (1928) by Bishop Alma White, published by the Pillar of Fire Church in Zarephath, New Jersey

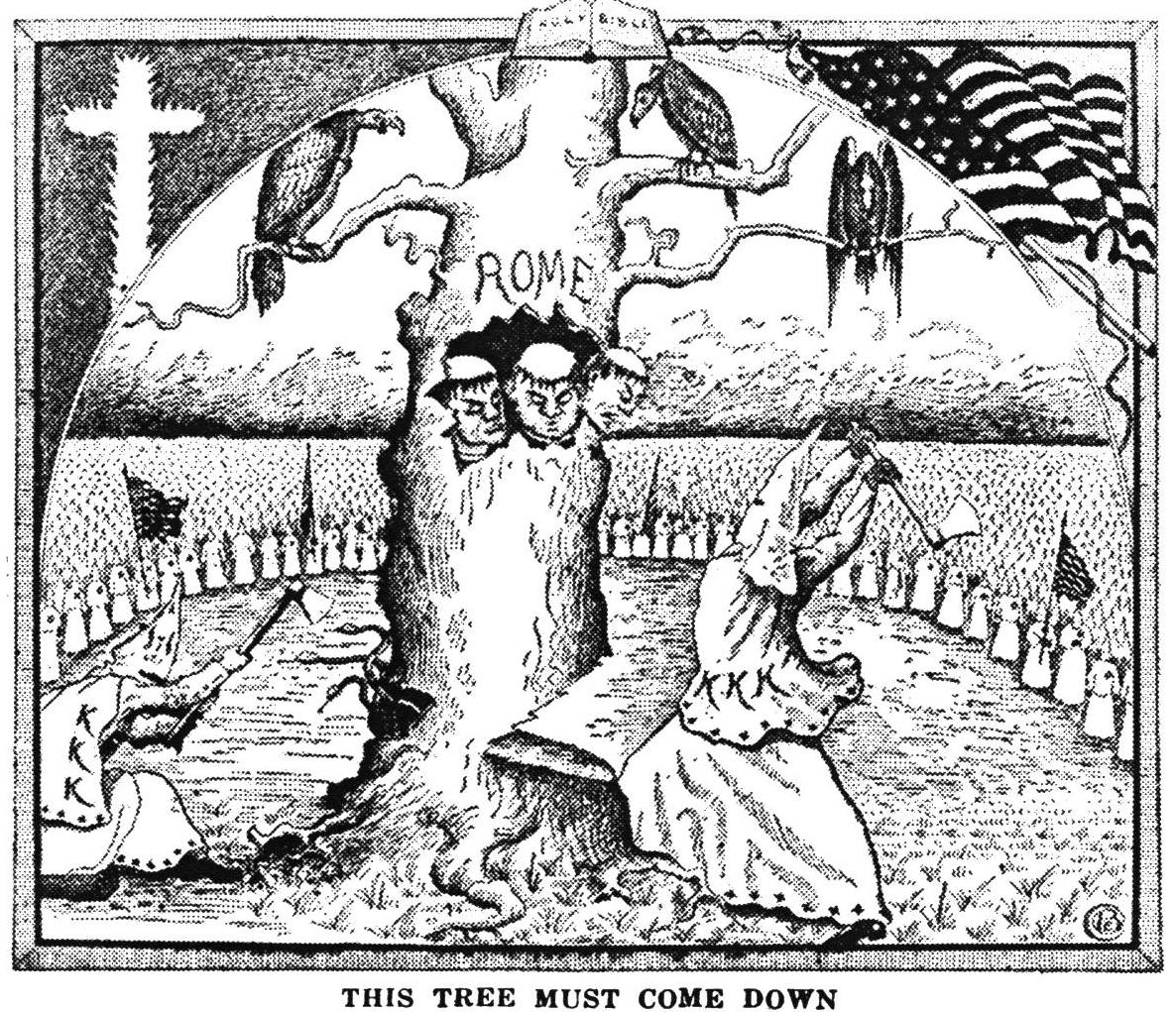
Branford Clarke illustration in The Ku Klux Klan in Prophecy (1925) by Bishop Alma White, published by the Pillar of Fire Church in Zarephath, New Jersey

Because many of the British colonists, such as the Puritans and Congregationalists, were fleeing religious persecution by the Church of England, much of early American religious culture exhibited the more extreme anti-Catholic bias of these Protestant denominations. Monsignor John Tracy Ellis wrote that a "universal anti-Catholic bias was brought to Jamestown in 1607 and vigorously cultivated in all the thirteen colonies from Massachusetts to Georgia". Colonial charters and laws often contained specific proscriptions against Catholics. For example, the second Massachusetts charter of October 7, 1691, decreed "that forever hereafter there shall be liberty of conscience allowed in the worship of God to all Christians, except Papists, inhabiting, or which shall inhabit or be resident within, such Province or Territory". Historians have only identified one Catholic who lived in colonial Boston – Ann Glover. She was hanged as a witch in 1688, four years before the much more famous witchcraft trials in nearby Salem.

Monsignor Ellis noted that a common hatred of the Catholic Church could unite Anglican clerics and Puritan ministers despite their differences and conflicts. One of the Intolerable Acts passed by the British Parliament that helped fuel the American Revolution was the Quebec Act of 1774, which granted freedom of worship to Roman Catholics in Canada.

==== New nation ====
The patriot reliance on Catholic France for military, financial and diplomatic aid led to a sharp drop in anti-Catholic rhetoric. Indeed, the king replaced the pope as the demon patriots had to fight against. Anti-Catholicism remained strong among loyalists, some of whom went to Canada after the war while most remained in the new nation. By the 1780s, Catholics were extended legal toleration in all of the New England states that previously had been so hostile. "In the midst of war and crisis, New Englanders gave up not only their allegiance to Britain but one of their most dearly held prejudices."

George Washington was a vigorous promoter of tolerance for all religious denominations as commander of the army (1775–1783) where he suppressed anti-Catholic celebrations in the Army and appealed to French Catholics in Canada to join the American Revolution; a few hundred of them did. Likewise he guaranteed a high degree of freedom of religion as president (1789–1797), when he often attended services of different denominations. The military alliance with Catholic France in 1778 changed attitudes radically in Boston. Local leaders enthusiastically welcomed French naval and military officers, realizing the alliance was critical to winning independence. The Catholic chaplain of the French army reported in 1781 that he was continually receiving "new civilities" from the best families in Boston; he also noted that "the people in general retain their own prejudices." By 1790, about 500 Catholics in Boston formed the first Catholic Church there.

Fear of the pope agitated some of America's Founding Fathers. For example, in 1788, John Jay urged the New York Legislature to prohibit Catholics from holding office. The legislature refused, but did pass a law designed to reach the same goal by requiring all office-holders to renounce foreign authorities "in all matters ecclesiastical as well as civil". Thomas Jefferson, looking at the Catholic Church in France, wrote, "History, I believe, furnishes no example of a priest-ridden people maintaining a free civil government", and "In every country and in every age, the priest has been hostile to liberty. He is always in alliance with the despot, abetting his abuses in return for protection to his own."

==== 1840s–1850s ====
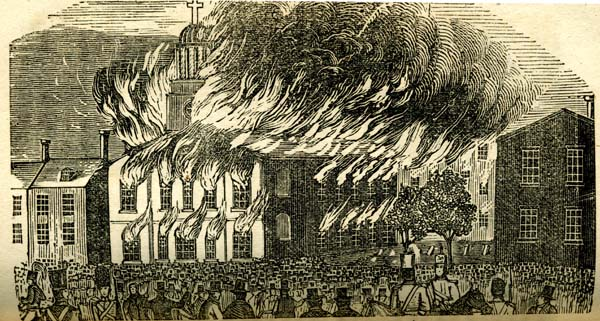
Burning of St. Augustine Church during the Philadelphia nativist riots in 1844

Anti-Catholic fears reached a peak in the nineteenth century when the Protestant population became alarmed by the influx of Catholic immigrants. Irish and German Catholic immigrants in particular were pouring into the US at rapid speeds in the early decades of the nineteenth century. Some settled in urban centers in the East, but a large portion also began moving to the unsettled western land along the Mississippi River Valley. The land provided the resources that they would need to survive in their new home, but it also created tensions with the Protestant Americans looking to inhabit the land themselves. Theories about the Roman Catholic Church's intentions were abundant since it appeared that the church was impeding on the Protestants' right to the western lands.

Some Protestant ministers preached the belief that the Catholic Church is the Whore of Babylon which is described in the Book of Revelation. The resulting "nativist" movement, which achieved prominence in the 1840s, was whipped into a frenzy of anti-Catholicism that led to mob violence, most notably the Philadelphia Nativist Riot of 1844. Historian David Montgomery argues that the Irish Catholic Democrats in Philadelphia had successfully appealed to the upper-class Whig leadership. The Whigs wanted to split the Democratic coalition, so they approved Bishop Kendrick's request that Catholic children be allowed to use their own Bible. That approval outraged the evangelical Protestant leadership, which rallied its support in Philadelphia and nationwide. Montgomery states:

The school controversy, however, had united 94 leading clergymen of the city in a common pledge to strengthen Protestant education and "awaken the attention of the community to the dangers which... threaten these United States from the assaults of Romanism." The American Tract Society took up the battle cry and launched a national crusade to save the nation from the "spiritual despotism" of Rome. The whole Protestant edifice of churches, Bible societies, temperance societies, and missionary agencies was thus interposed against Catholic electoral maneuvers ... at the very moment when those maneuvers were enjoying some success.

The nativist movement found expression in a national political movement called the "American" or Know-Nothing Party of 1854–1856. It had considerable success in local and state elections in 1854–55 by emphasizing nativism and warning against Catholics and immigrants. It nominated former president Millard Fillmore as its presidential candidate in the 1856 election. However, Fillmore was not anti-Catholic or nativist; his campaign concentrated almost entirely on national unity. Historian Tyler Anbinder says, "The American party had dropped nativism from its agenda." Fillmore won 22% of the national popular vote.

During this period of time, discussions of public versus religious education were growing in both urban and rural settings. Protestants and Catholics alike understood the importance of educating the youth; however, finding common ground on how to approach education became a challenge with differing values mixing together.

While the push for moderated school systems increased in the mid-nineteenth century, government oversight was common, especially in less-populated, rural regions. As such, the local church and community tended to create educational systems centered on their particular faith, and education was largely seen as a group effort. In urban areas, public education was more closely monitored and at the forefront of politics since cities saw the largest increases in immigrant population which brought in new children to educate.

Many Catholic immigrants coming into the United States found it was more comforting to stay tightly-knit with those of the same nationality, leading churches to create their own educational facilities for the children within a particular community. Every immigrant group coming from a Catholic country had unique saints to venerate and views on how to educate their children, so ethnic groups tended to stick together in order to preserve their traditions. Classes were taught in the immigrants' native language in an attempt to keep their culture alive as well, but many American Protestants viewed this negatively, as though the immigrants were unwilling to adjust to their new lives in an English-speaking nation.

The push for public education came from a hope that America would become a more prosperous place if it were made up of well-rounded, well-educated individuals. And because immigrants made up a large portion of the population, common education had to be established. Many Catholic communities wanted to remain separate, though, since public education tended to have Biblical influence from the Protestant Christian King James Bible. Major disputes erupted because the Catholic church did not want their youth to be educated under Protestant ideologies, as most public schools read Bible hymns and utilized McGuffey Readers, which featured Biblical passages teaching moral lessons to students from a Protestant point of view.

The disagreements between faiths led leaders of public education systems, typically Protestant in faith, to advocate for disintegration between schools. To the leaders, the Catholic community was not worthwhile and had too many differences from Protestantism; therefore, they assumed, combining educational systems would only bring about further complications. Additionally, combining systems meant leaders on either side would have to give up their authority in dictating the ideas and lessons pushed to the forefront in public education.

Anti-Catholicism among American Jews further intensified in the 1850s during the international controversy over the Edgardo Mortara case, when a baptized Jewish boy in the Papal States was removed from his family and refused to return to them.

==== 1860s–1890s ====
The First Vatican Council convened in 1869 and caused another rift to form between Catholics and Protestants. The Council passed the doctrine of papal infallibility, claiming that the pope, like Peter in ancient Christianity, retained an ability to make definitive decisions about official doctrinal disputes over faith and morals. Protestants viewed this as an attempt for the Roman Catholic Church and the pope, who was Pope Pius IX at the time, to establish greater power over their Catholic followers.

This distrust of Rome continued to infiltrate the educational facilities in the United States as well, leading to the fight for eliminating government-funded Catholic schooling. Many cities made attempts to integrate school systems, though there were varying degrees of success. One of the successful attempts was allowing Catholic teachers to find work within public schools, teaching children of countless denominations. But there were instances of limiting Catholics in public education as seen in Poughkeepsie, NY, in 1873 when a law was passed that forbade Catholic garments from being worn within public education facilities—it was not repealed until 1898.

In the Orange Riots in New York City in 1871 and 1872, Irish Catholics violently attacked Irish Protestants, who carried orange banners.

In 1875, another attempt at limiting Catholic funding came about in the form of the Blaine Amendment. It was brought into the courts after James G. Blaine, who was searching for a campaign platform for presidency, created an argument for defunding parochial, or denominational, schools. Though it was not explicitly stated to be against Catholicism, Catholic versus public education had been a heated topic for several years by this point. Many newspapers argued that Blaine wanted to build his following from those who held anti-Catholic beliefs. Although the amendment was vetoed, it made lasting impacts on the United States. After 1875, many states passed constitutional provisions, called "Blaine Amendments", forbidding tax money be used to fund parochial schools. In 2002, the United States Supreme Court partially vitiated these amendments, when they ruled that vouchers were constitutional if tax dollars followed a child to a school even if the school were religious.

A favorite rhetorical device in the 1870s was using the code words for Catholicism: "superstition, ambition and ignorance". President Ulysses Grant in a major speech to veterans in October 1875 warned that America again faced an enemy: religious schools. Grant saw another civil war in the "near future": it would not be between North and South, but will be between "patriotism and intelligence on the one side and superstition, ambition and ignorance on the other." According to historian Charles W. Calhoun, "at various points in his life, Grant had bristled privately at what he considered religious communicants' thralldom to a domineering clergy, but he did not specifically mention Catholicism in his speech. Still, Catholic journals decried the president's seeming exploitation of religious bigotry." In his December 1875 Annual Message to Congress, Grant urged taxation on "vast amounts of untaxed church property" which Professor John McGreevey says was "a transparently anti-Catholic measure since only the Catholic Church owned vast amounts of property – in schools, orphanages, and charitable institutions". Grant told Congress such legislation would protect American citizens from tyranny "whether directed by the demagogue or by priestcraft."

==== 20th and 21st centuries ====
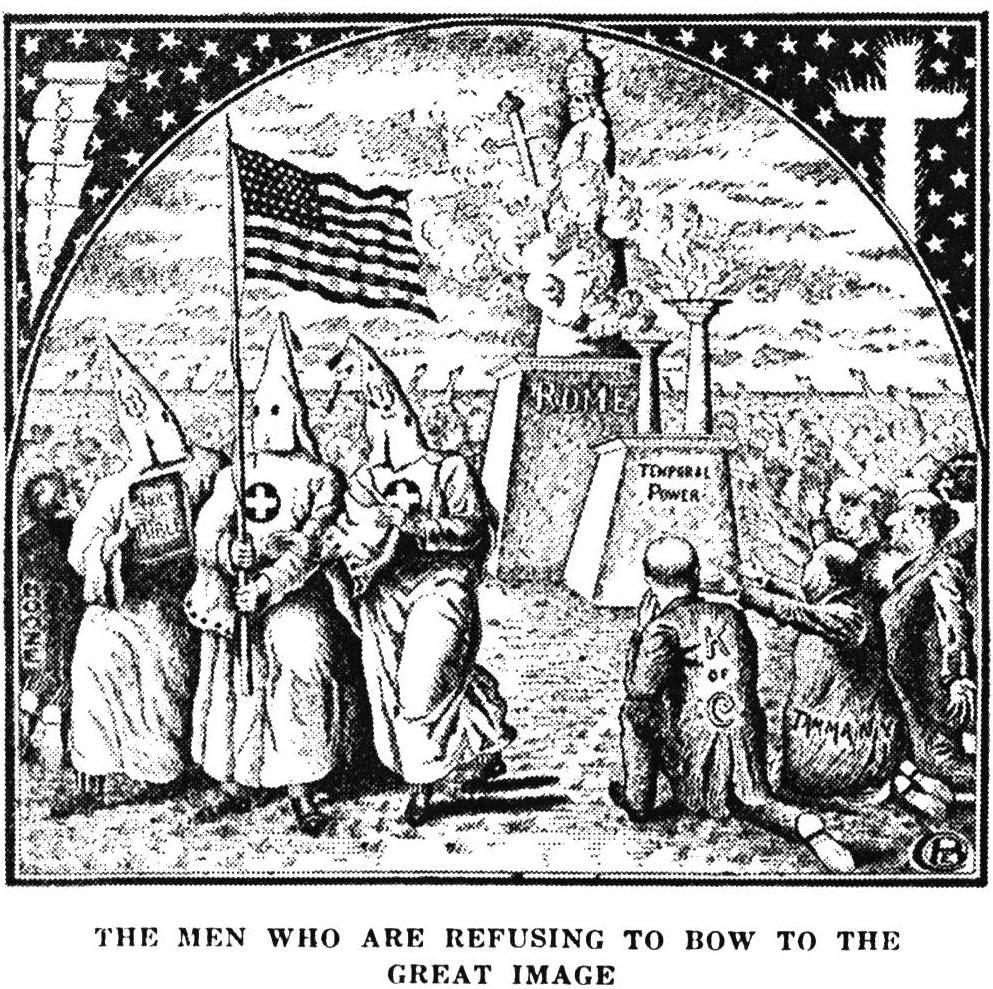
Among the kneeling Catholics are men who are marked K of C (Knights of Columbus) and Tammany (Tammany Hall), both politically powerful groups; illustrated by the Southern Mafia.

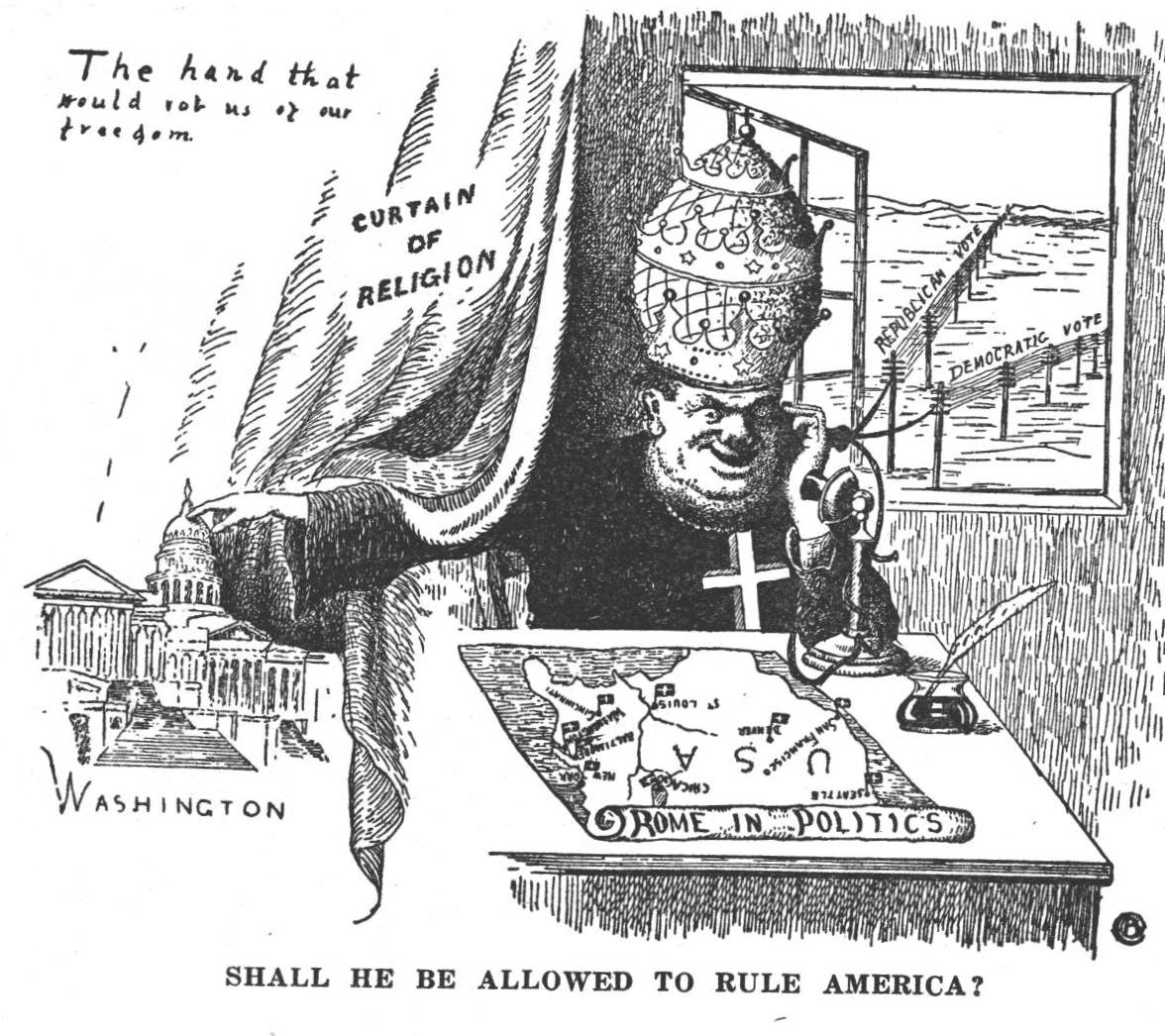
Guardians of Liberty 1943

Anti-Catholicism played a major role in the defeat of Al Smith, the Democratic nominee for president in 1928. Smith did very well in Catholic precincts, but he did poorly in the South relative to previous Democratic presidential candidates, as well as among the Lutherans of the North. His candidacy was also hampered by his close ties to the notorious Tammany Hall political machine in New York City and his strong opposition to prohibition. His cause was uphill in any case, because he faced a popular Republican leadership in a year of peace and unprecedented prosperity.

The passage of the 18th Amendment in 1919, a culmination of a half-century of anti-liquor agitation, also fueled anti-Catholic sentiment. Prohibition enjoyed strong support among dry pietistic Protestants, and equally strong opposition by wet Catholics, Episcopalians, and German Lutherans. The drys focused their distrust on the Catholics who showed little popular support for the enforcement of prohibition laws, and when the Great Depression began in 1929, there was increasing sentiment that the government needed the tax revenue which the repeal of Prohibition would bring.

Over 10 million Protestant soldiers who served in World War II came into close contact with Catholic soldiers; they got along well and, after the war, they played a central role in spreading a greater level of ethnic and religious toleration for Catholics among other white Americans. Although anti-Catholic sentiment declined in the U.S. in the 1960s, particularly after John F. Kennedy became the first Catholic U.S. president, traces of it persist in both the media and popular culture. In March 2000, the Catholic League criticized Slate magazine and journalist Jack Shafer for a piece the League described as taking "delight in justifying anti-Catholicism."

Anti-Catholic hate crimes against persons and property have also continued to occur. The summer of 2020 saw a wave of anti-Catholic acts which ranged from the vandalization of churches and cathedrals; to the destruction and often the decapitation of statues, particularly statues of St Junipero Serra, Mary, and Jesus; in states including Illinois and Florida. Many of these acts are tied to other political movements, the most notable of them is the QAnon movement, but other far right groups have also espoused anti-Catholic sentiment. One popular conspiracy theory is based on the belief that the three stars on the DC flag stand for London, the Vatican and Washington. Another far-right conspiracy claims the pope was arrested for sexual abuse.

== In primarily Catholic countries ==
Anti-clericalism is a historical movement that opposes religious (generally Catholic) institutional power and influence in all aspects of public and political life, and the involvement of religion in the everyday life of the citizen. It suggests a more active and partisan role than mere laïcité. The goal of anticlericalism is sometimes to reduce religion to a purely private belief-system with no public profile or influence. However, many times it has included outright suppression of all aspects of faith.

Anticlericalism has at times been violent, leading to murders and the desecration, destruction and seizure of Church property. Anticlericalism in one form or another has existed throughout most of Christian history, and it is considered to be one of the major popular forces underlying the 16th century reformation. Some of the philosophers of the Enlightenment, including Voltaire, continually attacked the Catholic Church, both its leadership and its priests, claiming that many of its clergy were morally corrupt. These assaults in part led to the suppression of the Jesuits, and played a major part in the wholesale attacks on the very existence of the Church during the French Revolution in the Reign of Terror and the program of dechristianization. Similar attacks on the Church occurred in Mexico and Portugal since their 1910 revolutions and in Spain during the twentieth century.

=== Austria ===
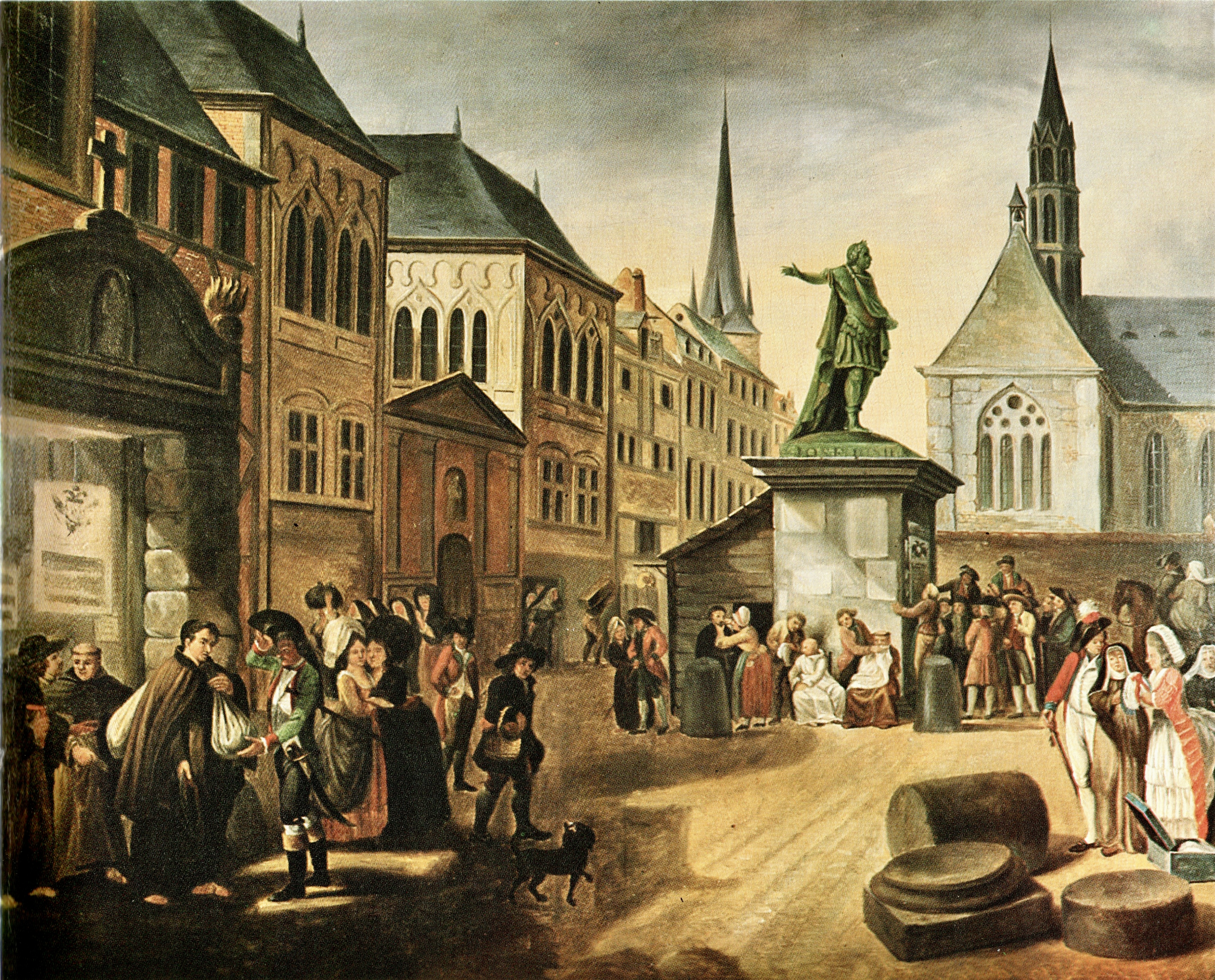
Suppression of convents under Joseph II, 1782

Holy Roman Emperor Joseph II (emperor 1765–1790) opposed what he called "contemplative" religious institutions – reclusive Catholic institutions that he perceived as doing nothing positive for the community. Although Joseph II was himself a Catholic, he also believed in firm state control of ecclesiastical matters outside of the strictly religious sphere and decreed that Austrian bishops could not communicate directly with the Roman Curia. His policies are included in what is called Josephinism, that promoted the subjection of the Catholic Church in the Habsburg lands to service for the state.

The Secularization Decree issued on 12 January 1782 banned several monastic orders not involved in teaching or healing and liquidated 140 monasteries. The banned monastic orders: Jesuits, Camaldolese, Order of Friars Minor Capuchin, Carmelites, Carthusians, Poor Clares, Order of Saint Benedict, Cistercians, Dominican Order (Order of Preachers), Franciscans, Pauline Fathers and Premonstratensians, and their wealth was taken over by the Religious Fund.

==== Austria-Hungary ====
Georg Ritter von Schönerer (1842–1921) was an Austrian landowner and politician of Austria-Hungary. He was a major opponent of political Catholicism and the founder of the movement Away from Rome!, aimed the conversion of all the Catholic German-speaking population of Austria to Lutheranism, or, in some cases, to the Old Catholic Churches.

=== Brazil ===
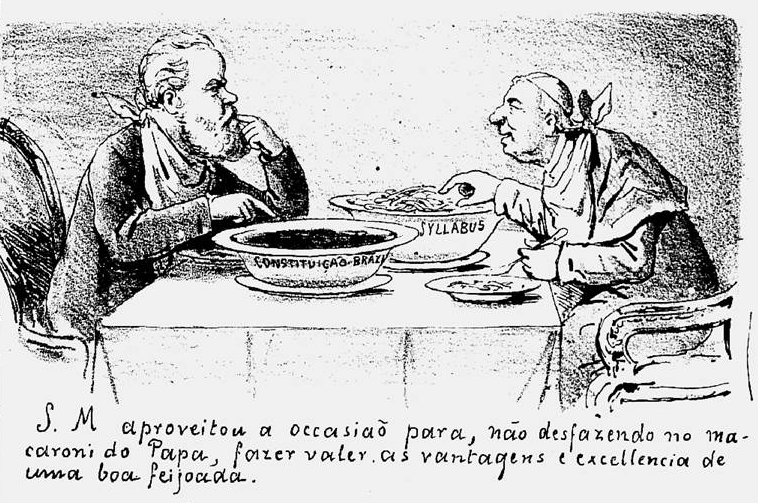
Cartoon alluding to the Religious Issue crisis in Brazil

Brazil has the largest number of Catholics in the world, and as a result, it has not experienced any large anti-Catholic movements.

During the 19th century, the Religious Issue was the name given to the crisis when Freemasons in the Brazilian government imprisoned two Catholic bishops for enforcing the Church's prohibition against Freemasonry.

Even during times in which the Church was experiencing intense conservatism, such as the era of the Brazilian military dictatorship, anti-Catholicism was not advocated by the left-wing movements (instead, Liberation theology gained force). However, with the growing number of Protestants (especially Neo-Pentecostals) in the country, anti-Catholicism has gained strength. A pivotal moment during the rise of anti-Catholicism was the kicking of the saint episode in 1995. However, owing to the protests of the Catholic majority, the perpetrator was transferred to South Africa for the duration of the controversy.

During the COVID-19 pandemic in Brazil, drug dealers took advantage of the pandemic to unite five slums in Rio de Janeiro imposing evangelical Protestantism on the area and attacking Catholics (and also members of Umbanda).

=== Colombia ===
Anti-Catholic and anti-clerical sentiments, some of which were spurred by an anti-clerical conspiracy theory which was circulating in Colombia during the mid-twentieth century, led to the persecution and killing of Catholics, most specifically, the persecution and killing of members of the Catholic clergy, during the events which are known as La Violencia.

=== Cuba ===
Cuba, under the rule of the atheist Fidel Castro, succeeded in reducing the ability of the Catholic Church to work by deporting one archbishop and 150 Spanish priests, by discriminating against Catholics in public life and education and refusing to accept them as members of the Communist Party. The subsequent flight of 300,000 Cubans from the island also helped to diminish the Church there.

=== France ===
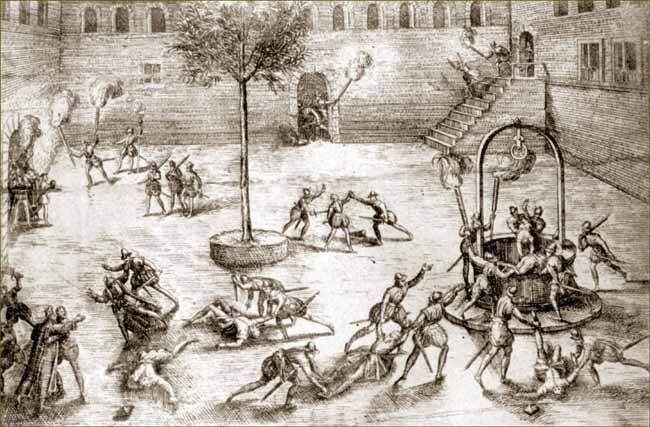
The Michelade massacre of Catholics by Huguenots in 1567

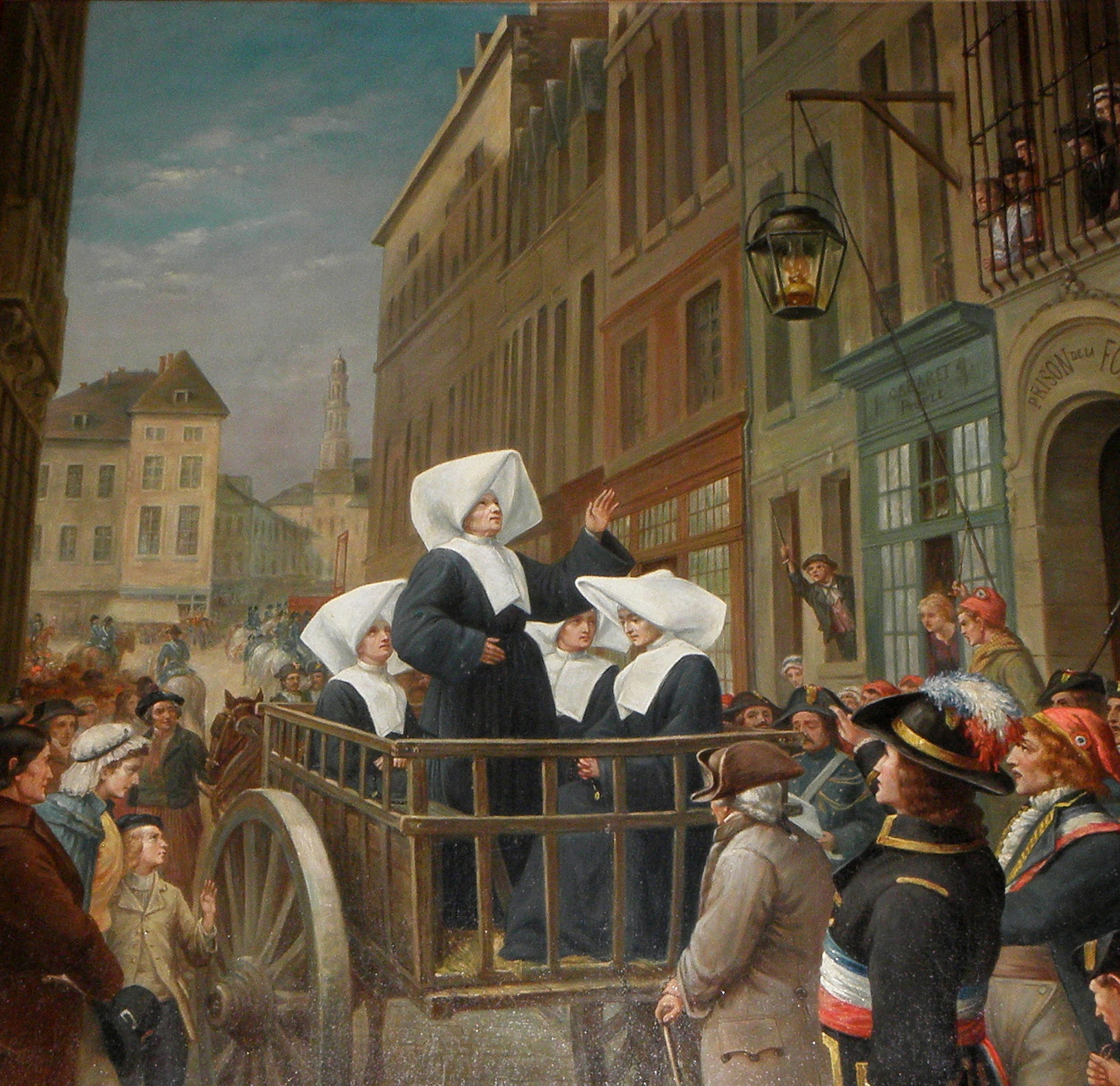
Nuns in a cart taking them to the guillotine in Cambrai during the Reign of Terror on 26 June 1794

During the French Revolution (1789–1795), the clergy and the laity were persecuted and Church property was confiscated and destroyed by the new government as part of a process of Dechristianization, the aims of which were the destruction of Catholic practices and the destruction of the very faith itself, culminating in the imposition of the atheistic Cult of Reason followed by the imposition of the deistic Cult of the Supreme Being. The persecution led Catholics who lived in the west of France to wage a counterrevolution, the War in the Vendée, and when the state was victorious, it killed tens of thousands of Catholics. A few historians have called the killings a genocide. However, other historians believe that the killings constituted a brutal crackdown against political enemies rather than a genocide. The French invasions of Italy (1796–1799) included an assault on Rome and the exile of Pope Pius VI in 1798.

Relations improved in 1802 when Napoleon came to terms with the Pope in the Concordat of 1801. It allowed the Church to operate but did not give back the lands; it proved satisfactory for a century. By 1815 the Papacy supported the growing alliance against Napoleon, and was re-instated as the State Church during the conservative Bourbon Restoration of 1815–1830. The brief French Revolution of 1848 again opposed the Church, but the Second French Empire (1851–1871) gave it full support. The history of 1789–1871 had established two camps – the left against the Church and the right supporting it – that largely continued until the Vatican II process in 1962–1965.

The Government of France's Third Republic (1871–1940) was dominated by anti-clericalism, the desire to secularise the State and cultural life, based on an obsession with being faithful to the most extreme currents of the French Revolution. This was the position of the radicals and socialists. in 1902 Émile Combes became Minister of the Interior, and the main energy of the government was devoted to furthering an anti-clerical agenda. The parties of the Left, Socialists and Radicals, united upon this question in the Bloc republicain, supported Combes in his application of the law of 1901 on the religious associations, and voted the new bill on the congregations (1904). By 1904, through his efforts, nearly 10,000 religious schools had been closed and thousands of priests and nuns left France rather than be persecuted. Under his guidance parliament passed the 1905 French law on the separation of Church and State, which reversed the Napoleonic arrangement of 1801.

In the Affaire Des Fiches, in France in 1904–1905, it was discovered that the militantly anticlerical War Minister under Combes, General Louis André, had imposed religious discrimination upon the French armed forces by using the Masonic Grand Orient de France's huge card index documenting which military officers were practicing Catholics and attended Mass and then blocking them from all future promotions. Exposure of the policy in the National Assembly by the opposition almost caused the government to fall; instead Emile Combes retired.

=== Italy ===
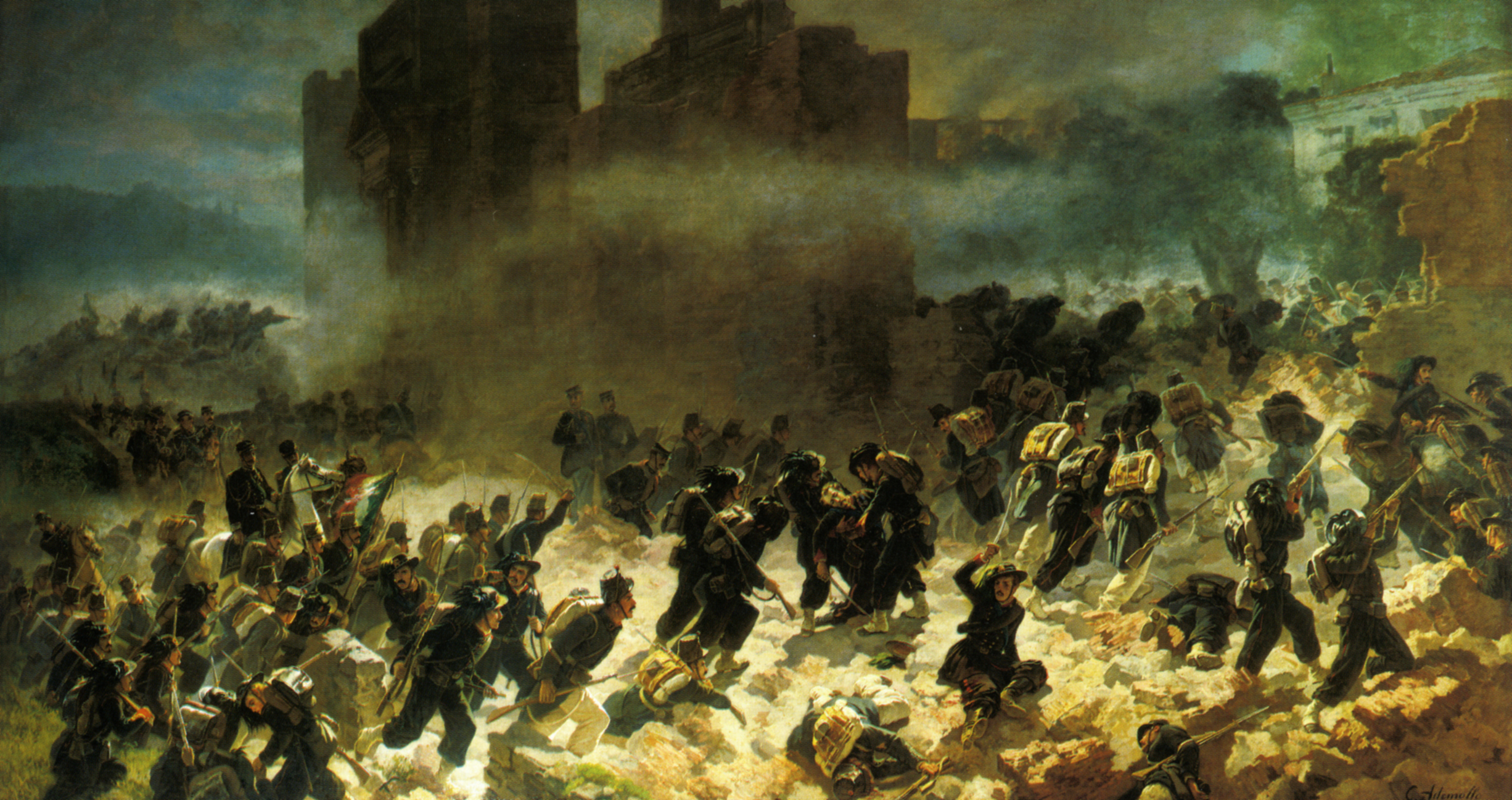
Italian troops breaching the Aurelian Walls at Porta Pia during the Capture of Rome. Breccia di Porta Pia (1880), by Carlo Ademollo. Afterwards, the Pope declared himself a "Prisoner in the Vatican".

In the Napoleonic era, anti-clericalism was a powerful political force. From 1860 through 1870, the new Italian government, under the House of Savoy, outlawed all religious orders, both male and female, including the Franciscans, the Dominicans and the Jesuits, closed down their monasteries and confiscated their property, and imprisoned or banished bishops who opposed this (see Kulturkampf). Italy took over Rome in 1870 when it lost its French protection; the Pope declared himself a prisoner in the Vatican. Relations were finally normalized in 1929 with the Lateran Treaty.

=== Ireland ===
Following the defeat of the Catholic King James II by William III at the Battle of the Boyne in 1690, the Protestant Ascendancy installed by the English Crown through Plantations, sought to consolidate their power and prevent any resurgence of Catholic influence. To achieve this, they enacted a series of laws known as the Penal Laws, designed to systematically oppress Catholics and other non-Anglican religious groups.

The Penal laws imposed a number of civil disabilities among Catholics, such as fines for participating in Catholic Worship, and even Capital Punishment for priests found to be practicing their ministry within Great Britain and Ireland. Catholics were also prohibited from being landed, Voting, Teaching, Holding any Public Office and bringing religious paraphernalia from Rome into Britain

=== Mexico ===
Following the Reform War, President Benito Juárez issued a decree nationalizing Church properties, separating Church and State, and suppressing religious orders.

In the wake of the Mexican Revolution, the Mexican Constitution of 1917 contained further anti-clerical provisions. Article 3 called for secular education in the schools and prohibited the Church from engaging in primary education; Article 5 outlawed monastic orders; Article 24 forbade public worship outside the confines of churches; and Article 27 placed restrictions on the right of religious organizations to hold property. Article 130 deprived clergy members of political rights.

Mexican President Plutarco Elías Calles's strict enforcement of previous anti-clerical legislation denying priests' rights, enacted as the Calles Law, prompted the Mexican Episcopate to suspend all Catholic worship in Mexico from August 1, 1926, and sparked the bloody Cristero War of 1926–1929 in which some 50,000 peasants took up arms against the government. Their slogan was "¡Viva Cristo Rey!" (Long live Christ the King!).

The effects of the war on the Church were profound. Between 1926 and 1934 at least 40 priests were killed. Where there were 4,500 priests serving the people before the rebellion, in 1934 there were only 334 priests licensed by the government to serve fifteen million people, the rest having been eliminated by emigration, expulsion, assassination or not obtaining licenses. It appears that ten states were left without any priests. Other sources indicate that the persecution was such that, by 1935, 17 states had no registered priests.

Some of the Catholic casualties of this struggle are known as the Saints of the Cristero War. Events relating to this were famously portrayed in the novel The Power and the Glory by Graham Greene.

=== Nicaragua ===
In recent years the Catholic Church has experienced persecution at the hands of the Government, led by Daniel Ortega. As of November 2022, 11 Catholic priests remained in custody, most of which for political offences. Rolando Alvarez, Bishop of Matagalpa and a prominent critic of Ortega, was arrested in 2023, and then exiled in January 2024. Several Catholic media outlets were shuttered by the Government, and police harassment of Catholics and clergy was widespread, with Catholic charity Aid to the Church in Need (ACN) considering Nicaragua the country of most concern regarding persecution of the Church in all of Latin America in 2022.

The situation led Pope Francis to publicly express his concern over lack of religious freedom in Nicaragua.

The crackdown on the Church is a response to growing criticism of the regime and its human and civil rights abuses by the Church hierarchy and priests. The Churches opened their doors to welcome people fleeing regime forces after demonstrations, and to care for those wounded in confrontations with the authorities, which led the Government to accuse the Catholic Church of siding with the demonstrators, according to the testimony of one priest who spoke, under anonymity for fear of reprisals, to ACN. The priest in question claimed to have personally rescued 19 demonstrators with AK-47 bullet wounds, after the hospitals had been ordered not to help them. "During those days, the people on our church benches were not listening to the Gospel, they were living it", said the priest.

In 2023, the country was scored 2 out of 4 for religious freedom. In the same year, the country was ranked as the 50th most difficult place in the world to be a Christian.

In recent years, the Catholic Church in Nicaragua has faced increased scrutiny and actions from government authorities. In a notable event, the Nicaraguan police, known for their loyalty to President Daniel Ortega's administration, announced an investigation into several dioceses for potential money laundering. According to their reports, significant sums were discovered in various Church facilities, and there were allegations of illegal withdrawals from bank accounts that were legally frozen.

In March 2022, Nicaragua withdrew its approval of Archbishop Waldemar Stanislaw Sommertag, Apostolic Nuncio in Managua and ordered him to leave the country. Then, in March 2023, Nicaragua officially severed ties with the Holy See, and by August of that year, the Nicaraguan government banned the Jesuits and seized their assets.

According to Catholic charity Aid to the Church in Need, at least 46 priests were under arrest at some point in Nicaragua in 2023. Many of these priests ended up being exiled at the beginning of 2024.

The government has banned traditional Holy Week processions since 2023. Some churches that obtained special permission to hold them are now restricted to short walks toward their main altars. According to Nicaraguan lawyer in exile Martha Patricia Molina, there has been a crackdown aimed at preventing participants from performing the Judeas passion plays, which are "theatrical representations of the passion and death of Christ".

=== Philippines ===
Joseph Kavanagh of the Jesuits, a teacher at the San Jose Seminary, observed in 1955 that many of the doctrinal attacks of the Filipino new religious movement known as the Iglesia ni Cristo, particularly against the Catholic Church, were unoriginal and had been answered before. He also noted that their founder Felix Manalo's anti-Catholicism essentially makes him a Protestant, and the church doctrines were more of a "potpourri of borrowings from several different creeds, the fruit, undoubtedly, of Mr. Manalo's spiritual wanderings."

=== Poland ===
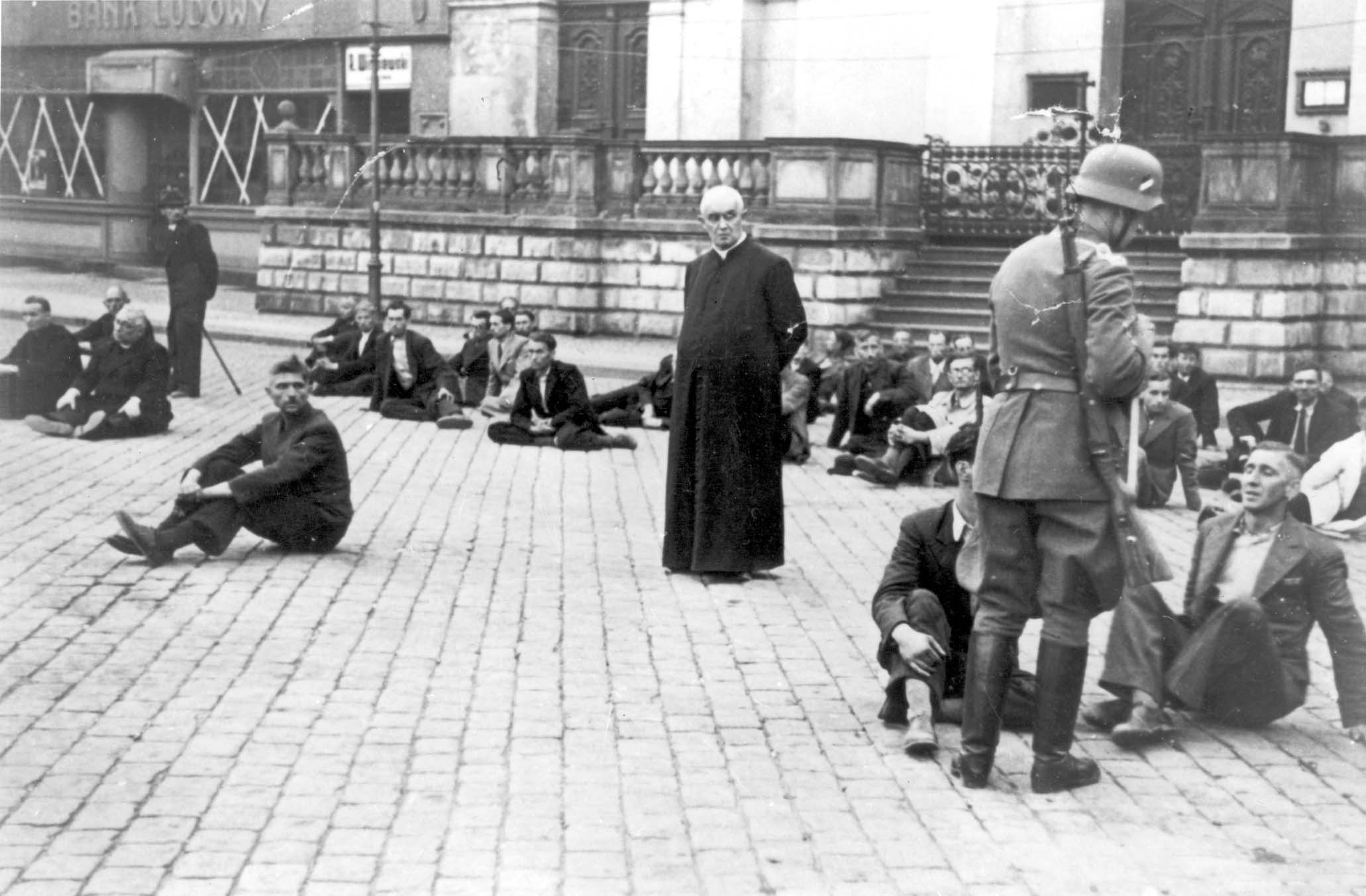
Polish priest and other Polish civilians as German hostages awaiting execution in Bydgoszcz, Poland, September 1939

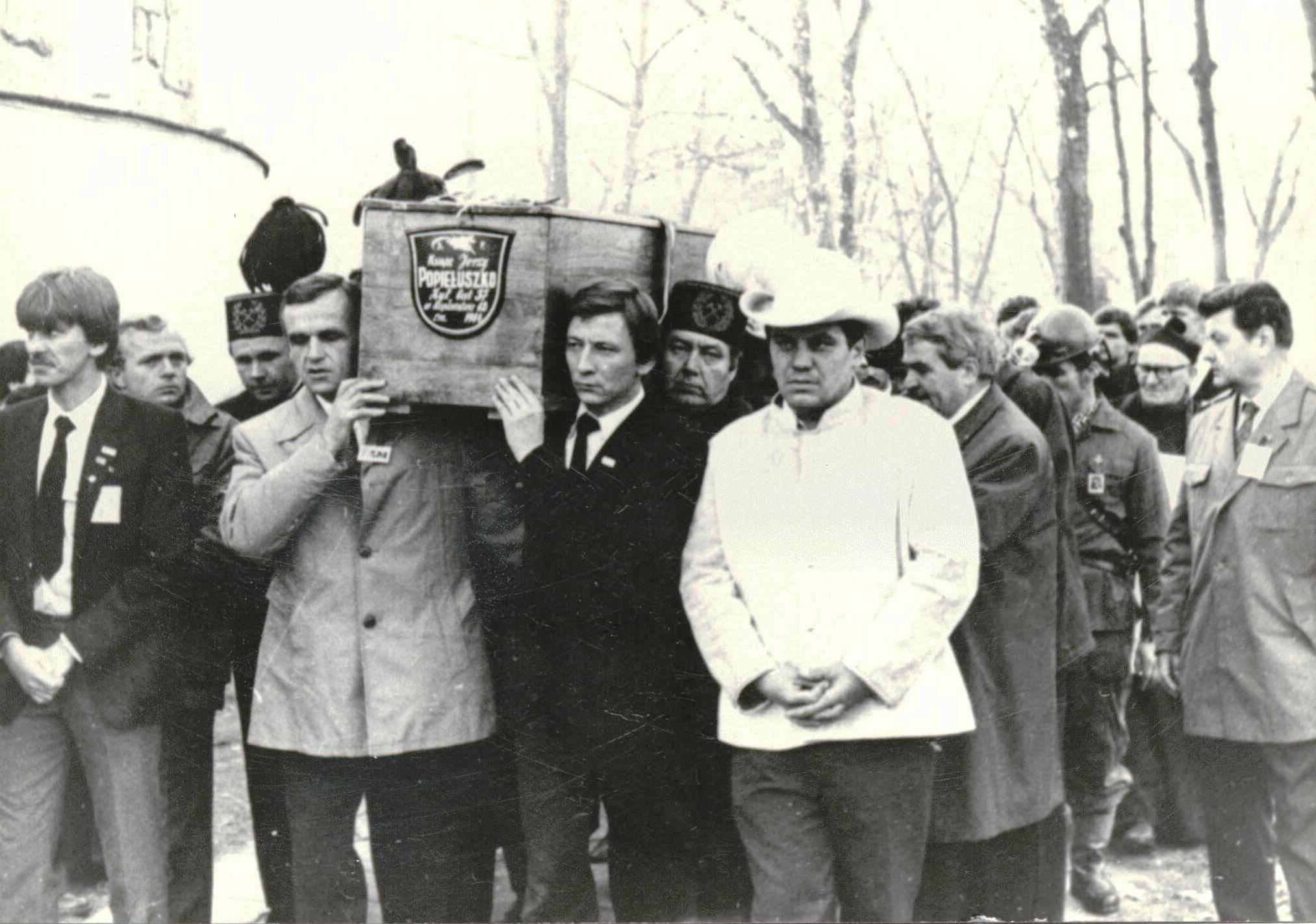
Funeral of Jerzy Popiełuszko, a Catholic priest killed by Communist authorities

For the situation in Russian Poland, see Anticatholicism in Russian Empire

Catholicism in Poland, the religion of the vast majority of the population, was severely persecuted during World War II, following the Nazi invasion of the country and its subsequent annexation into Germany. Over 3 million Catholics of Polish descent were murdered during the Invasion of Poland, including 3 bishops, 52 priests, 26 monks, 3 seminarians, 8 nuns and 9 lay people, later beatified in 1999 by Pope John Paul II as the 108 Martyrs of World War II.

The Roman Catholic Church was even more violently suppressed in Reichsgau Wartheland and the General Government. Churches were closed, and clergy were deported, imprisoned, or killed, among them was Maximilian Kolbe, a Pole of German descent. Between 1939 and 1945, 2,935 members of the Polish clergy (18%) were killed in concentration camps. In the city of Chełmno, for example, 48% of the Catholic clergy were killed.

Catholicism continued to be persecuted under the Communist regime from the 1950s. Contemporary Stalinist ideology claimed that the Church and religion in general were about to disintegrate. Initially, Archbishop Wyszyński entered into an agreement with the Communist authorities, which was signed on 14 February 1950 by the Polish episcopate and the government. The Agreement regulated the matters of the Church in Poland. However, in May of that year, the Sejm breached the Agreement by passing a law for the confiscation of Church property.

On 12 January 1953, Wyszyński was elevated to the rank of cardinal by Pius XII as another wave of persecution began in Poland. When the bishops voiced their opposition to state interference in ecclesiastical appointments, mass trials and the internment of priests began – the cardinal being one of its victims. On 25 September 1953 he was imprisoned at Grudziądz, and later placed under house arrest in monasteries in Prudnik near Opole and in Komańcza Monastery in the Bieszczady Mountains. He was released on 26 October 1956.

Pope John Paul II, who was born in Poland as Karol Wojtyla, often cited the persecution of Polish Catholics in his stance against Communism.

=== Spain ===
Anti-clericalism in Spain at the start of the Spanish Civil War resulted in the killing of almost 7,000 clergy, the destruction of hundreds of churches and the persecution of lay people in Spain's Red Terror. Hundreds of Martyrs of the Spanish Civil War have been beatified and hundreds more in October 2007.

== In mixed Catholic-Protestant countries ==
=== Switzerland ===
The Jesuits (Societas Jesu) were banned from all activities in either clerical or pedagogical functions by Article 51 of the Swiss constitution in 1848. The reason for the ban was the perceived threat to the stability of the state resulting from Jesuit advocacy of traditional Catholicism; it followed the Roman Catholic cantons forming an unconstitutional separate alliance leading to civil war. In June 1973, 55% of Swiss voters approved removing the ban on the Jesuits (as well as Article 52 which banned monasteries and convents from Switzerland). (See Kulturkampf and Religion in Switzerland)

== In primarily Orthodox countries ==
=== Byzantine Empire ===
In the East–West Schism of 1054, the Eastern Orthodox Church and the Catholic Church broke their full communion with each other because of Ecclesiastical differences, Theological, and Liturgical disputes.

In April 1182, the Eastern Orthodox population of the Byzantine Empire committed a large-scale massacre against the Catholic population of Constantinople, this massacre is known as the Massacre of the Latins and it further worsened relations and increased enmity between Eastern Orthodoxy and Catholicism.

=== Russian Empire ===
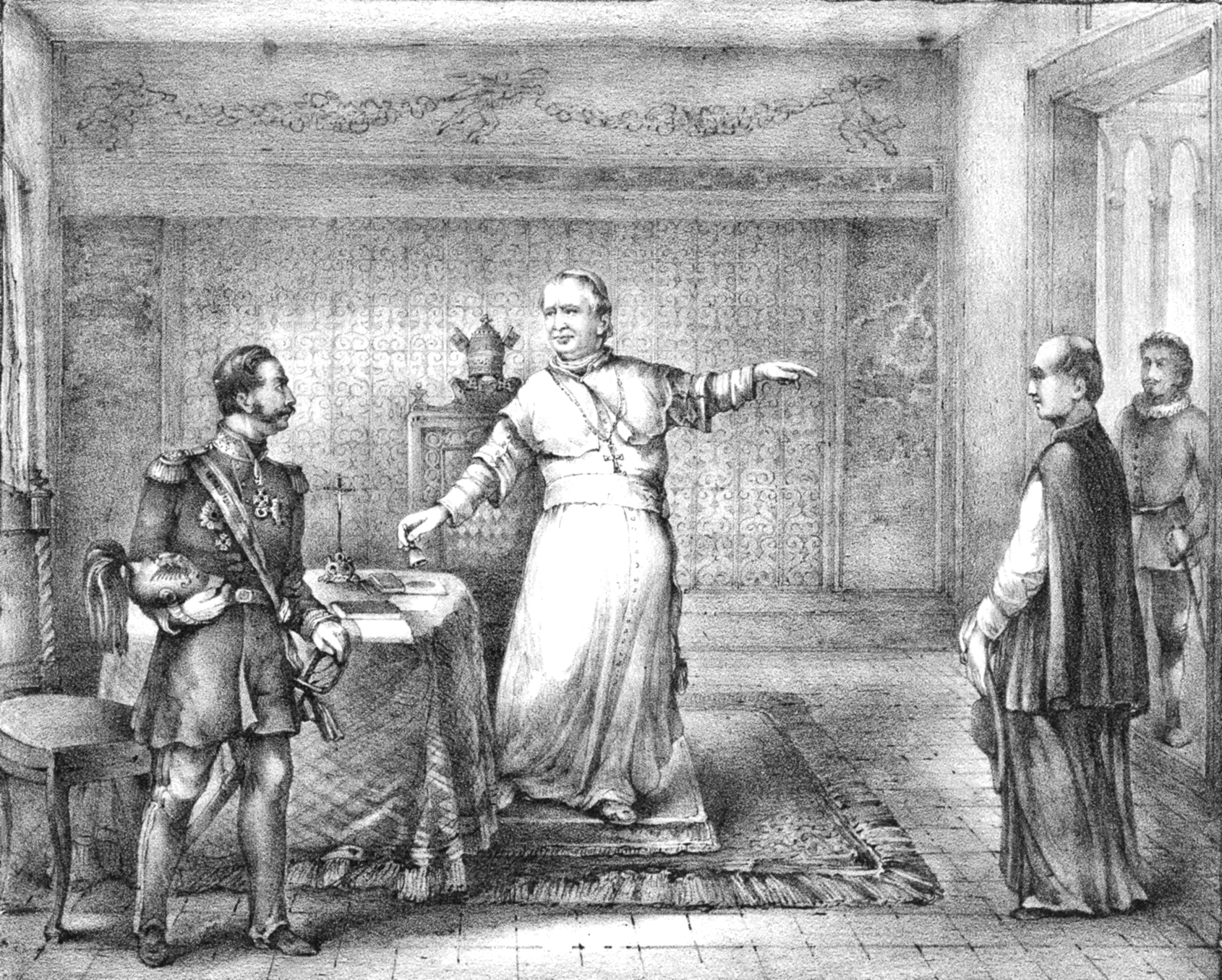
Expulsion of the Imperial Russian envoy Felix von Meyendorff to the Holy See by Pope Pius IX for insulting the Catholic faith.

During Russian rule, Catholics, primarily Poles and Lithuanians, suffered great persecution not only because of their ethnic-national background, but also for religious reasons. Especially after the uprisings of 1831 and 1863, and within the process of Russification (understanding that there is a strong link between religion and nationality), the tsarist authorities were anxious to promote the conversion of these peoples to the official faith, intervening in public education in those regions (an Orthodox religious education was compulsory) and censoring the actions of the Catholic Church. In particular, attention was focused on the public actions of the Church, such as masses or funerals, because they could serve as the focus of protests against the occupation. Many priests were imprisoned or deported because of their activities in defense of their religion and ethnicity. In the late nineteenth century, however, there was a progressive relaxation of the control of Catholic institutions by the Russian authorities. Additionally, all the Eastern Catholic population was forced to convert to the Orthodox faith, with refusal often being met with violence and even murder, like the martyrs of Pratulin.

=== Former Yugoslavia ===
During World War II in Yugoslavia, the Chetniks killed an estimated 18,000–32,000 Croats, who were mostly Roman Catholic. The terror tactics against the Croats were, to at least an extent, a reaction to the genocide which the Ustaše committed against the Serbs. Along with mass murder, the Ustashe conducted religious persecution of Serbs that included a policy of forced conversion from Eastern Orthodoxy to Roman Catholicism, often with the participation of local Catholic priests. However, the largest Chetnik massacres took place in eastern Bosnia, where they preceded significant Ustashe operations. Croats (and Muslims) who lived in areas that were intended to be parts of Greater Serbia were supposed to be cleansed of non-Serbs, in accordance with Mihailović's directive of 20 December 1941. About 300 villages and small towns were destroyed, along with a large number of mosques and Catholic churches. Fifty-two Catholic priests were killed by Chetniks throughout the war. A number of Catholic nuns were also raped and killed, including the killing of several nuns from Goražde in December 1941.

During the war in Croatia, the ICTY determined that ethnic Croats were persecuted on political, racial and religious grounds, as part of a general campaign of killings and forced-removals of Croat civilians. This included the deliberate destruction of religious buildings and monuments. Approximately 450 Catholic churches were destroyed or severely damaged, with another 250 suffering lesser damages. In addition, approximately 151 rectories, 31 monasteries, and 57 cemeteries were destroyed or severely damaged. While another 269 religious buildings were destroyed during the Bosnian War.

=== Greece ===
In a 1827 report, Blancis enumerated crimes (assaults, killings, thefts, etc) committed by orthodox settlers against Catholics.

The Metropolitan bishop of Piraeus in the Church of Greece Seraphim is known for his anti-Catholic rhetoric. He has accused the Catholic Church of corrupting doctrine and has called the Catholic Church a "para-Synagogue". He often uses the term "Papism".

=== Ukraine ===
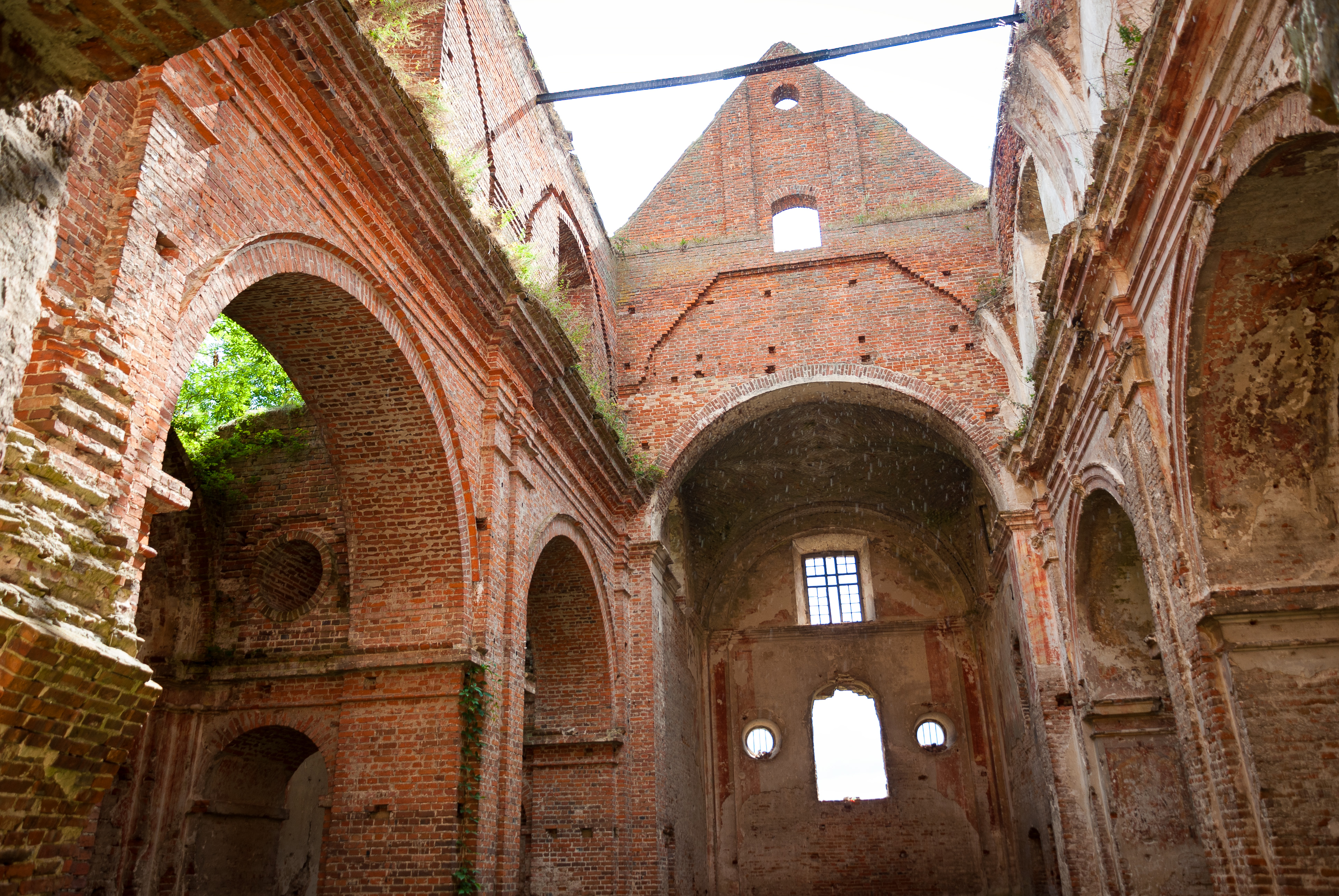
The Kisielin massacre was a slaughter of Polish worshippers on 11 July 1943 during a Sunday mass.

The Khmelnytsky Uprising in the 17th century has a symbolic meaning in the history of Ukraine's relationship with Poland. It ended the Polish Catholic szlachta′s domination over the Ukrainian Orthodox population. The insurgency was accompanied by mass atrocities committed by Cossacks against prisoners of war and the civilian population, including Latin and Ruthenian Catholic clergy.

Attacks on Catholic Poles during the massacres in Volhynia and Eastern Galicia in 1943–1945 were marked with extreme brutality. The UPA's actions resulted in up to 100,000 Polish deaths. The Roman Catholic Church suffered huge losses in UPA attacks. According to Norman Davies, "Roman Catholic priests were axed or crucified. Churches were burned with all their parishioners."

An OUN order from early 1944 stated:

Liquidate all Polish traces. Destroy all walls in the Catholic Church and other Polish prayer houses."

In the separatist region which is known as the Donetsk People's Republic, the government has declared that the Russian Orthodox Church of the Moscow Patriarchate is the state religion in 2014, and Protestant churches have been occupied by paramilitaries. Jehovah's Witnesses have lost their property, and their Kingdom Halls have been occupied by rebels in the Donetsk and Luhansk regions. Roman Catholic, Greek Catholic, Ukrainian Orthodox, and Protestant clergy have been kidnapped by groups such as the Russian Orthodox Army, and they have also been accused of opposing Russian Orthodox values. Human Rights Watch says that the bodies of several members of the Church of the Transfiguration were found in a mass grave in 2014.

== Non-Christian nations ==
=== Bangladesh ===
On 3 June 2001, nine people were killed by a bomb explosion at a Roman Catholic church in the Gopalganj District.

=== Burkina Faso ===
On May 12, 2019, six Catholics including a priest were killed by gunmen who rode on motorcycles and stormed a church in Dablo during a Sunday morning mass. A day later, on May 13, 2019, four people were killed and a statue of the Virgin Mary was destroyed by armed men in an attack on Catholic parishioners during a religious procession in the remote village of Zimtenga.

=== China ===
The Daoguang Emperor modified an existing law, making the spread of Catholicism punishable by death. During the Boxer Rebellion, Catholic missionaries and their families were murdered by Boxer rebels. During the 1905 Tibetan Rebellion, Tibetan rebels murdered Catholics and Tibetan converts.

Since the founding of the People's Republic of China, all religions including Catholicism only operate under state control. However, many Catholics do not accept State control of the Church and as a result, they worship clandestinely. There has been some rapprochement between the Chinese government and the Vatican.

Chinese Christians have reportedly been persecuted in both official and unsanctioned churches. In 2018, the Associated Press reported that China's paramount leader Xi Jinping "is waging the most severe systematic suppression of Christianity in the country since religious freedom was written into the Chinese constitution in 1982", which has involved "destroying crosses, burning bibles, shutting churches and ordering followers to sign papers renouncing their faith".

Japanese soldiers murdered the French Canadian Jesuit Catholic priests Armand Lalonde, Alphonse Dubé and Prosper Bernard in Feng County, Jiangsu on 18 March 1943.

Japanese soldiers murdered Catholic priests and monks in January 1939 in Hejian and September 1941 in Yuntaishan. Several figures of Catholic Saints and convents and churches were destroyed by Japanese in Hong Kong.

=== Japan ===
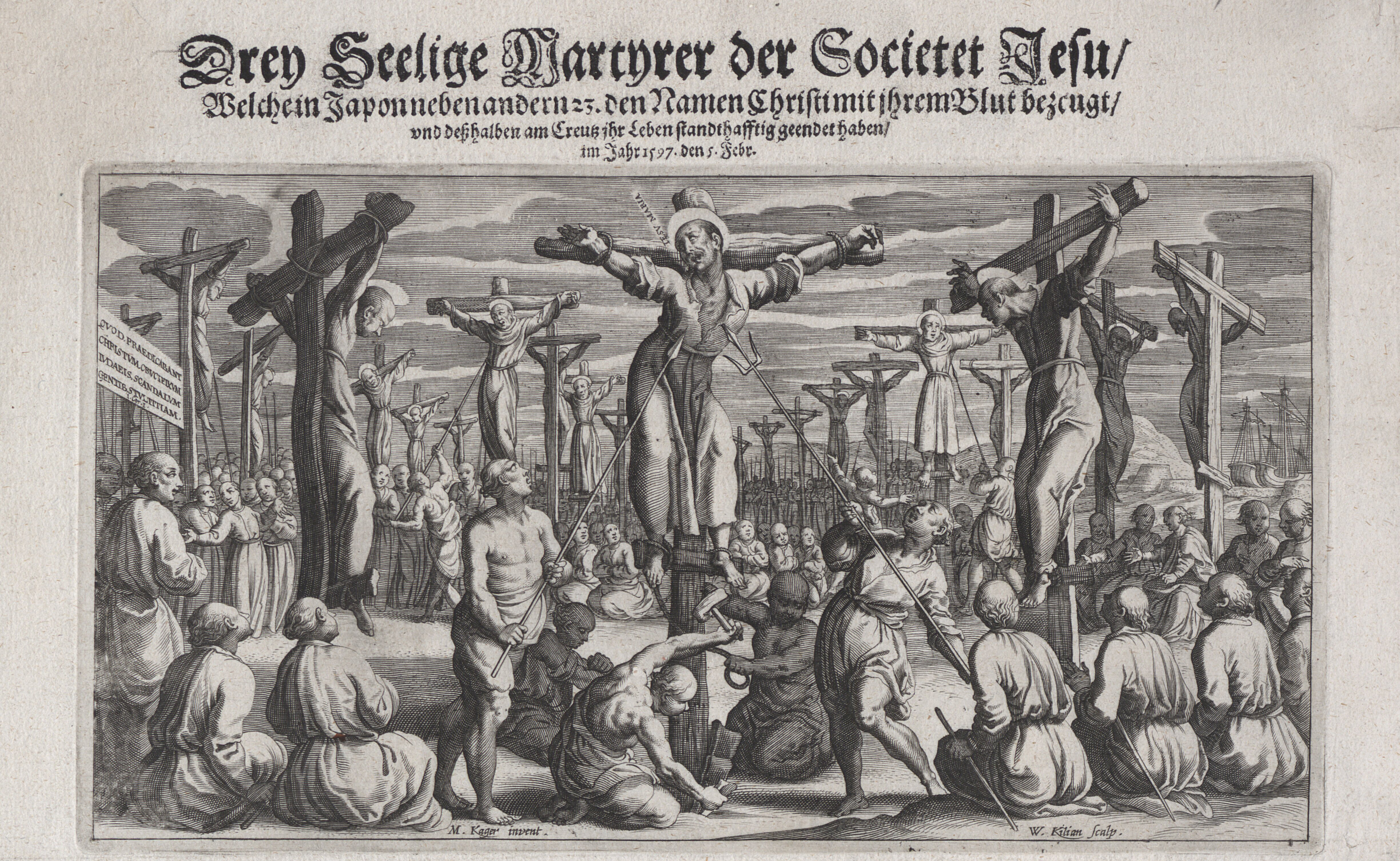
The 26 Martyrs of Japan at Nagasaki, 1628 engraving

On 5 February 1597 a group of twenty-six Catholics were killed on the orders of Toyotomi Hideyoshi. During the Tokugawa Shogunate, Japanese Catholics were suppressed, leading to an armed rebellion during the 1630s. After the rebellion was crushed, Catholicism was further suppressed and many Japanese Catholics went underground. Catholicism was not openly restored to Japan until the 1850s.

=== Pakistan ===
The Catholic Church continues to be persecuted. As recently as April 2009 armed men attacked a group of Christians in Taiser Town, near Karachi. They set ablaze six Christian houses and injured three Christians, including an 11-year-old boy, who was in critical condition in the hospital.

The minorities in Swat Valley are fleeing the area as the Taliban have imposed a tax on non-Muslims, the Catholic Bishops' Conference president Archbishop Lawrence Saldanha has said, urging the Pakistani president and prime minister to intervene. The government has recently allowed the imposition of Sharia laws in parts of the North West Frontier Province much to the detriment of non-Muslims.

In 2009, Pakistan is the only country in the world with a "blasphemy law". The constitution also ensures that a non-Muslim cannot become president, prime minister, or any of the 11 senior most government positions in the country.

On 30 July 2009, tensions arose in the Christian village of Korian after pages containing Islamic inscriptions were found in front of a Christian home. Muslims then accused a family there of blasphemy against Islam. On 1 August 2009, a Muslim mob raided a Christian settlement in Gojra, vandalizing and looting houses and causing the deaths of eight people and injuries to many others. Fifty Christian homes were destroyed. Pope Benedict XVI expressed profound sorrow at anti-Christian riots in Pakistan and appealed to everyone to renounce violence and take up again the path of peace. He communicated this message in a telegram to Faisalabad Bishop Joseph Coutts.

St. Thomas' Church, Wah Cantt, was attacked by a group of armed men on 28 March 2011 which resulted in damages. It is believed that the incident was related to the recent episode of the burning of the Quran by Pastor Terry Jones in the U.S.

The situation in Pakistan deteriorated to such an extent that by 2013 large numbers of Christians started to seek asylum overseas.

=== Sri Lanka ===
==== Government actions ====
In Sri Lanka, A Buddhist-influenced government took over 600 parish schools in 1960 without compensation and secularized them. Attempts were made by future governments to restore some autonomy.

==== Anti-Catholic violence ====
Since 2000, in a context of rising violence against religious minorities, i.e. Christians, Muslims and Hindus, multiple attacks on Catholic churches occurred. For instance, in 2009, a mob of 1,000 smashed the interior of a church in the town of Crooswatta, assaulting parishioners with clubs, swords and stones, forcing several of them to be treated in hospitals. In 2013, vandals smashed a statue of the Virgin Mary as well as a tabernacle, and they also tried to burn the Eucharist at a church in Angulana, near Colombo.

The term "anti-Catholic Catholic" has come to be applied to Catholics who are perceived to view the Catholic Church with animosity. Traditionalist or conservative Catholics frequently use it as a descriptive term for modernist or liberal Catholics, especially those modernist or liberal Catholics who seek to reform Church doctrine, make secularist critiques of the Catholic Church, or place secular principles above Church teachings. Those who take issue with the Catholic theology of sexuality are especially prone to be given this label.

== Suppression of the Jesuits ==
Prime Minister Pombal of Portugal was aggressively hostile to the Jesuit order because it reported to an Italian power – the Pope – and it also tried to operate independently rather than operate under the control of the government. In Portugal as well as in much of Catholic Europe, he waged a full-scale war against the Jesuits. The Jesuit order was suppressed in the Portuguese Empire (1759), France (1764), the Two Sicilies, Malta, Parma, the Spanish Empire (1767), and Austria and Hungary (1782). The Pope himself suppressed the order everywhere in 1773, but it survived in Russia and Prussia. The suppression of the Jesuits was a major blow to Catholic education across Europe, with nearly 1000 secondary schools and seminaries being shut down. Their lands, buildings, and endowments were confiscated; their teachers were scattered. Although Jesuit education had become old-fashioned in Poland and other areas, it was the main educational support network for Catholic intellectuals, senior clergy, and prominent families. Governments unsuccessfully attempted to replace all of those schools, but there were far too few non-clerical teachers who were suitable.

The Jesuit order was restored by the pope in 1814, and it flourished in terms of rebuilding schools and educational institutions, but it never regained its enormous political power. The suppression of the Jesuits has been described as "an unmitigated disaster for Catholicism." The political weakness of the once-powerful institution was on public display for more ridicule and bullying. The Church lost its best educational system, its best missionary system, and its most innovative thinkers. Intellectually, it would take two centuries for the Church to fully recover.

== In popular culture ==
Anti-Catholic stereotypes are a long-standing feature of English literature, popular fiction, and pornography. Gothic fiction is particularly rich in this regard. Lustful priests, cruel abbesses, immured nuns, and sadistic inquisitors appear in such works as The Italian by Ann Radcliffe, The Monk by Matthew Lewis, Melmoth the Wanderer by Charles Maturin and "The Pit and the Pendulum" by Edgar Allan Poe. Additionally, priests, clergymen, and even regular Catholic laity are oftentimes portrayed as pedophiles in media, due to the sex abuse scandals within the church in recent times.

== See also ==
- Anti-Christian sentiment
- Anti-clericalism
- "Popery"
- Black Legend, purported anti-Spanish historiography with strong anti-Catholic overtones
- Catholic–Eastern Orthodox relations
- Catholic–Protestant relations
- History of the Catholic Church
- History of Christianity
- History of the Eastern Orthodox Church
- History of Protestantism
- Persecution of Christians
- Protestant Revolution (Maryland)
- Sectarian violence among Christians

== Sources ==
- Franklin, James (2006), "Freemasonry in Europe", Catholic Values and Australian Realities, Connor Court Publishing Pty Ltd, pp. 7–10, ISBN 978-0-9758015-4-3
- Hoare, Marko Attila (2006). Genocide and Resistance in Hitler's Bosnia: The Partisans and the Chetniks. Oxford: Oxford University Press. ISBN 978-0-19-726380-8.
- Ramet, Sabrina P. (2006). The Three Yugoslavias: State-Building and Legitimation, 1918–2005. Bloomington, Indiana: Indiana University Press. ISBN 978-0-253-34656-8.
- Sobolevski, Mihael (2004). "Pljačka i teror Dinarske četničke divizije na području općine Krivi put 28. i 29. prosinca 1944" [Robbery and Terror of Dinara Chetnik Division in the Krivi Put Region on 28th and 29th December 1944]. The Anthology of Senj: Contributions to Geography, Ethnology, Economy, History and Culture (in Croatian). 31 (1). Zagreb, Croatia: Croatian Institute of History: 271–289.
- Tomasevich, Jozo (1975). War and Revolution in Yugoslavia, 1941–1945: The Chetniks. Stanford, California: Stanford University Press. ISBN 978-0-8047-0857-9.
