= Explanatory Notes Upon the New Testament =

Biblical commentary and translation

Explanatory Notes Upon the New Testament (sometimes called simply Notes on the New Testament) is a Biblical commentary and translation of the New Testament by English Methodist theologian John Wesley. First published in 1755, the work went through five editions in Wesley's lifetime.

== Development ==
In 1753 Wesley became gravely ill, leaving him temporarily unable to travel and preach. As a result of this he set to work on a Biblical commentary and translation. He began writing on 4 January 1754 and continued without preaching until March, by which point he had produced a rough draft of the translation. Wesley's pace was slowed by other activities, and he completed the commentary on 23 September 1755, publishing the same year. Further updates were made in 1759 and 1787. In 1790 the translation was published without an accompanying commentary. He was aided in his work by his brother Charles Wesley.

== Content ==
=== Translation ===
Wesley worked from Greek manuscripts of the New Testament, particularly those of Johann Albrecht Bengel, keeping his translation closely in line with the King James Version (KJV). He made around 12,000 minor alterations to the KJV, many of which have been incorporated into modern translations such as the Revised Version. Wesley attempted to modernise the dated language of the KJV. He also changed many occurrences of the word "shall" to "will", thereby downplaying an emphasis on predestination within the text and bringing it more in line with Methodist theology.

=== Commentary ===
In his preface, Wesley claimed that his notes were aimed at the "unlearned reader", and were meant to be anti-sectarian in nature. He based his work on four earlier commentaries: Gnomon Novi Testamenti by Bengel, The Family Expositor by Philip Doddridge, The Practical Expositor by John Guyse and Theological Lectures by John Heylyn. Many parts of the commentary were merely transcriptions or translations of these texts. All four authors were doctrinally Calvinist, while Wesley was Arminian in his theology. As such Wesley refrained from using these texts when issues of predestination and free will were raised.

Wesley focused on providing historical context in his commentary, giving explanations of the Jewish court system and the positions of groups such as the Sadducees and the Pharisees. Wesley's doctrine of Christian perfection that features heavily in his other writings is notably absent in his notes.

== See also ==
- The Wesley Study Bible
