= Clansman =

Clansman often refers to a member of a clan, especially an Irish clan or Scottish clan.

Klansman often refers to a member of the Ku Klux Klan.

The terms, or variations thereof, may also refer to:

== Athletics ==
- Clansmen, former nickname of the athletic programs at Simon Fraser University in British Columbia, Canada—now the Simon Fraser Red Leafs
- Clansmen, nickname of the American football team at the University of Stirling in Scotland
- Klansmen, former nickname of the athletic programs at Belhaven College (now University) in Jackson, Mississippi, U.S.—now the Belhaven Blazers
- Scottish Clansmen, an Australian rules football club based in Scotland

== Entertainment ==
=== Film ===
- The Clansman, alternate name of The Birth of a Nation, 1915 American drama film by D. W. Griffith
- The Klansman, 1974 American drama film based on the 1965 novel by William Bradford Huie

=== Literature ===
- The Clansman (1905), a pro-Ku Klux Klan novel and play by Thomas F. Dixon Jr.
- Klansmen: Guardians of Liberty, 1926 political manifesto by Alma Bridwell White
- The Clansman (1959 novel), a historical novel written by Nigel Tranter, see Historical novels by Nigel Tranter set after 1603
- The Klansman, 1965 novel by William Bradford Huie

=== Other entertainment ===
- "The Clansman", a song by Iron Maiden from the 1998 album Virtual XI
- "Klansmen" (The Professionals), an episode of the British crime-action television drama series

== Transportation ==
- The Clansman, a train service between London and the Highlands, replaced by Highland Chieftain
- Clansman 30, the 30-foot (9.1 m) Clansman class of yacht
- MV Clansman, a ferry launched in 1998, fifth of the name
- MV Clansman (1964), a ferry launched in 1964, fourth of the name
- SS Empire Clansman (1942–1965), the Empire ship Clansman, a collier

== Other uses ==
- Clansman (military radio), a British military radio system
- Clansman Ale, a beer brewed by Hebridean Brewing Company
- The Clansman (or Jenny’s), a fictional pub in the Scottish television series Still Game

== See also ==
- Black Klansman (disambiguation)
- Klan (disambiguation)
- Clan (disambiguation)
