= Klan (disambiguation) =

Klan most commonly refers to the Ku Klux Klan, a white supremacy group.

KLAN or Klan may also refer to:

== Radio and television ==
- KLAN (FM), an FM radio station licensed to Glasgow, Montana
- Klan (TV series), a Polish television series
- Klan Kosova, a Kosovan TV channel
- Klan TV, an Albanian TV channel

== Other uses ==
- Anthony Klan, an Australian investigative journalist
- Capital Region International Airport, the Lansing, Michigan airport's ICAO code
- Klan (magazine), an Albanian political and business weekly
- "Klan" (song), a 2021 song by Italian singer Mahmood
- Klan, Ivory Coast, a defunct commune in Sassandra-Marahoué District, Ivory Coast

== See also ==
- Clan (disambiguation)
- Clansman (disambiguation)
