= Branford Clarke =

American evangelical preacher

Branford Edward Clarke
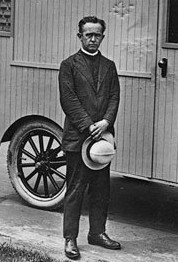
- Clarke in 1922
- Born: March 18, 1885; London, England
- Died: July 7, 1947 (aged 62); Somerset, New Jersey, United States
- Occupations: Minister, poet and artist
- Employer: Pillar of Fire Church
- Spouse: Esther May Clarke (1896–1988) (m. 1920)
- Children: Branford Clarke, Jr. (1920–2003)

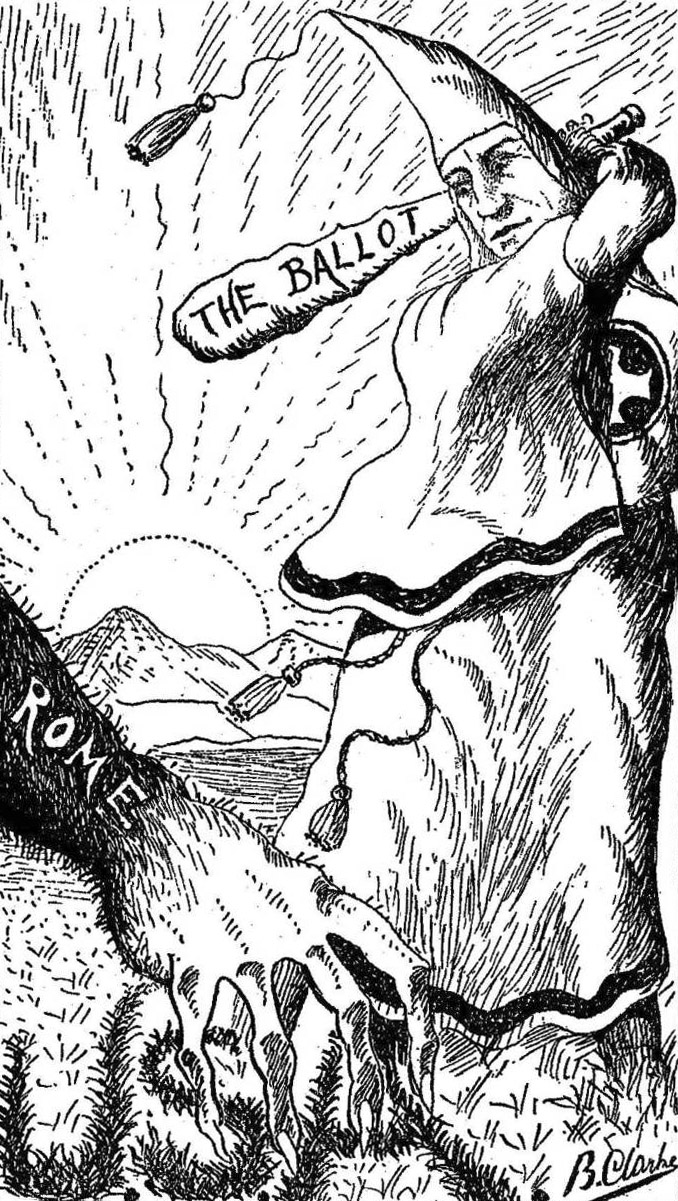
From Heroes of the Fiery Cross 1928.

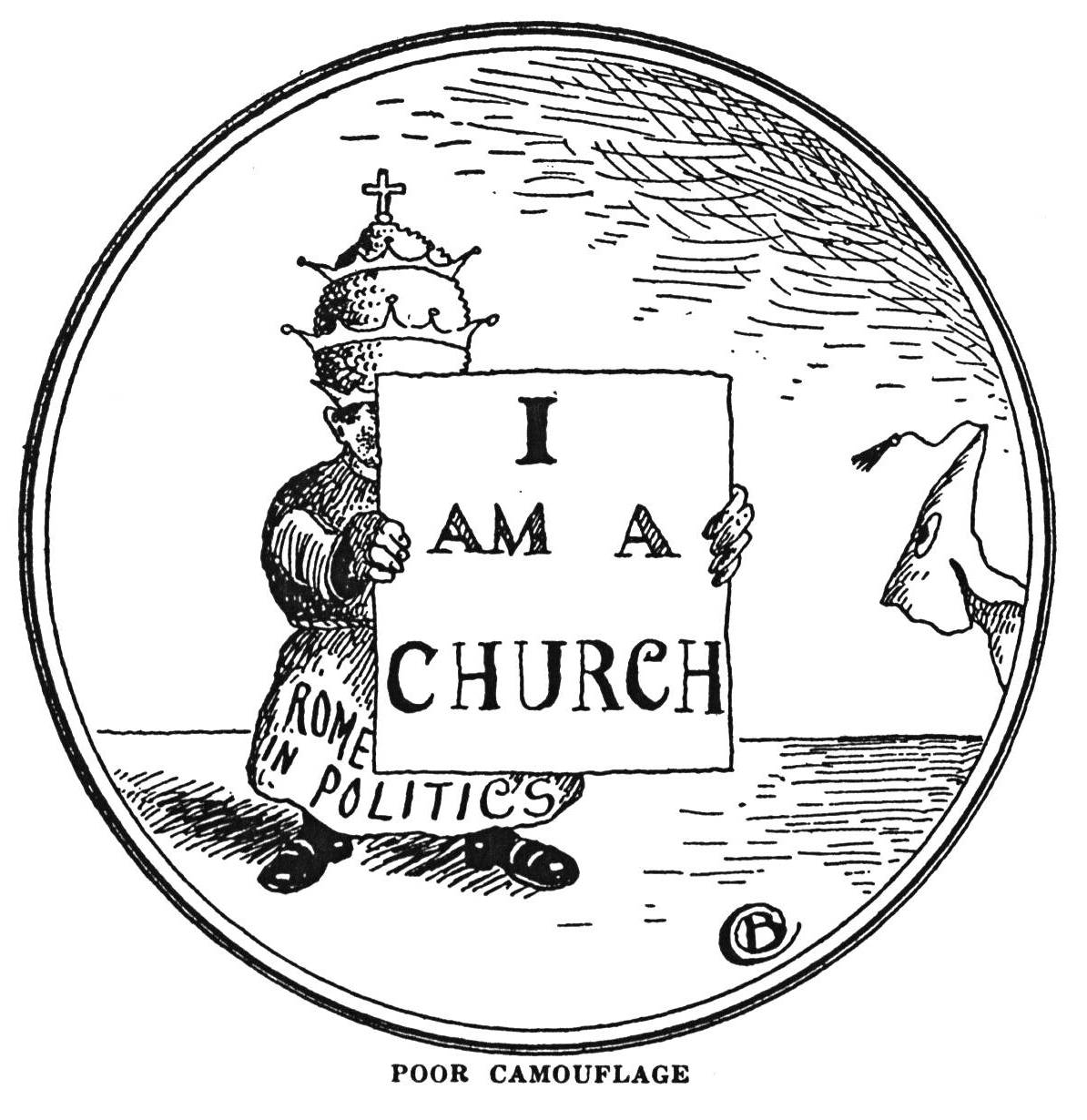
"Poor Camouflage." Branford Clarke illustration in Klansmen: Guardians of Liberty 1926 by Bishop Alma White published by the Pillar of Fire Church in Zarephath, NJ.

Branford Edward Clarke (March 18, 1885 – July 7, 1947) was an Evangelical preacher, poet and artist who promoted the Ku Klux Klan through his art which was drawn for the Pillar of Fire Church and their publications.

== Biography ==
He was born on March 18, 1885, in London, England. His brother was a Member of Parliament. In the 1920s he converted a Model T into a mobile chapel. He was pastor of the Pillar of Fire Church in Brooklyn, New York, for at least several years. From about 1925 to 1928 he illustrated numerous religious and political publications for the Pillar of Fire Church in partnership with Bishop Alma White, the church's founder and leader. Many of his illustrations supported Bishop White's writings by attacking various minorities including Catholics, Jews, and US immigrants and by promoting the Ku Klux Klan, and women's suffrage.

He died on July 7, 1947, and was buried in the Pillar of Fire cemetery in Zarephath, New Jersey. His epitaph reads "The Cross he bore, through years of service bound, on yonder shore in recompense is found, The Crown."

== Artwork ==
=== Books ===
- Poems and Pictures by a Preacher (1921)
- The Ku Klux Klan In Prophecy (1925)
- Klansmen: Guardians of Liberty (1926)
- Heroes of the Fiery Cross (1928)
- Woman's Chains (1943): 9 illustrations
- Guardians of Liberty Vol I-III, (1943)

=== Periodicals ===
- The Good Citizen (1913–1933)

=== Hymns ===
Several of Clarke's poems were set to music by his wife Esther and published as hymns in the Pillar of Fire's Cross and Crown Hymnal. Some of Branford Clarke's hymns include: Tell Me of the Love of Jesus, Everything Will Work Out Right, God Keep Me Strong, Prayer Changes Things, Calling Again and Again, Take Heart, and Yonder Shore.

Yonder Shore
Life may have clouds, but when I think of Jesus
The sun breaks thro' its radiance to outpour
And far away I hear the song of angels
Singing, singing, singing on yonder shore.

There is a cross that every one must carry
Long a thorned path whose toils will soon be o'er
Then at His feet shall we lay down our burdens
With the fair immortals on yonder shore.

While trav'ling on to that eternal haven
Here in the heart can be fair Canaan's door
Thro' which the love of Jesus softly stealing
Fills the soul with glory from yonder shore.

There is a death, but it is only mortal
The soul lives on and on for evermore.
How wonderful to dwell for aye with Jesus
Ever and forever on yonder shore.

Chorus
Singing on that shore
Singing on that shore
Hark, I hear them singing
Singing, ever, singing on yonder shore.

== Images ==
From Heroes of the Fiery Cross 1928.

From Heroes of the Fiery Cross 1928.

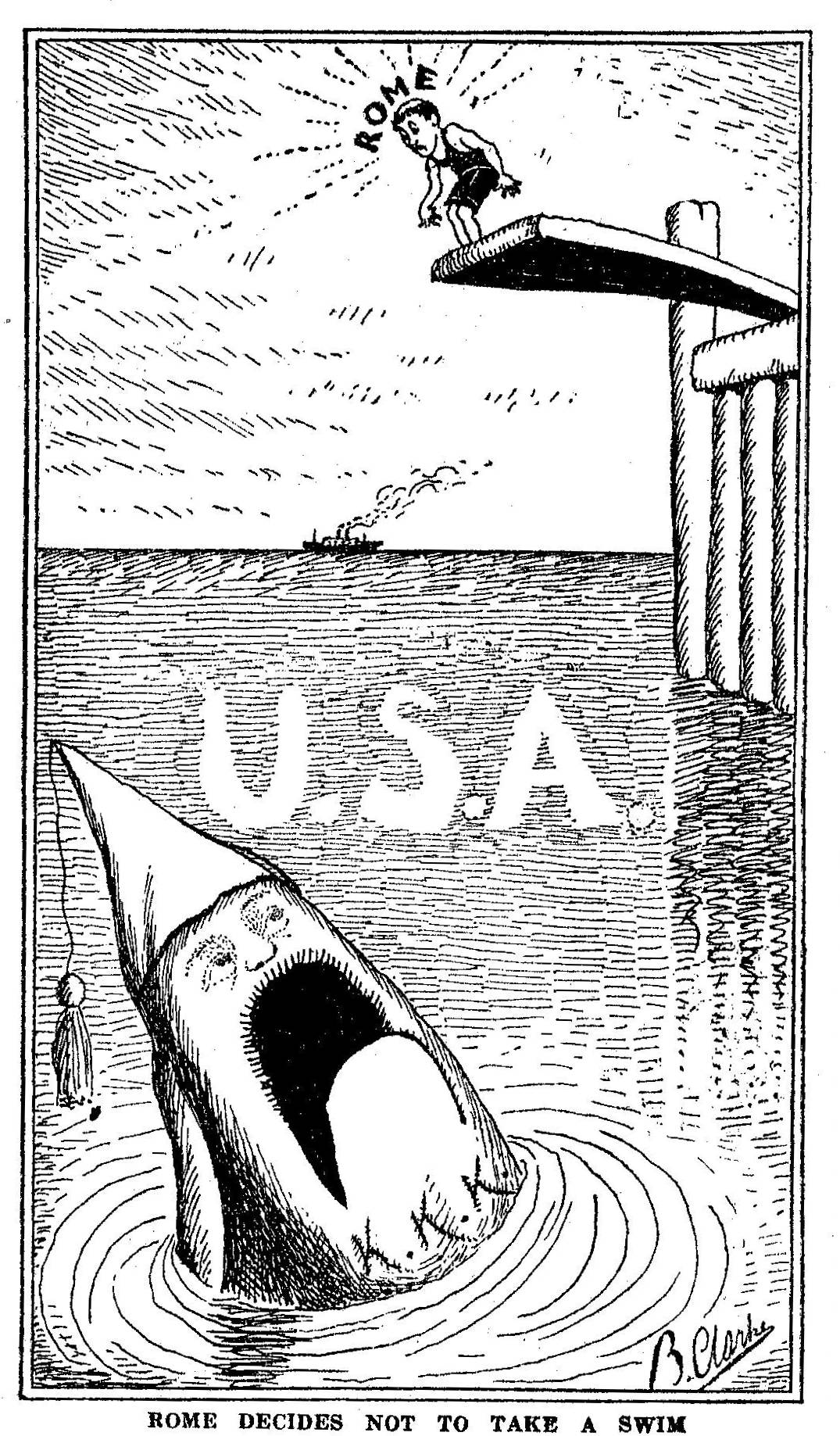
From Heroes of the Fiery Cross 1928.

From Heroes of the Fiery Cross 1928.

From Heroes of the Fiery Cross 1928.

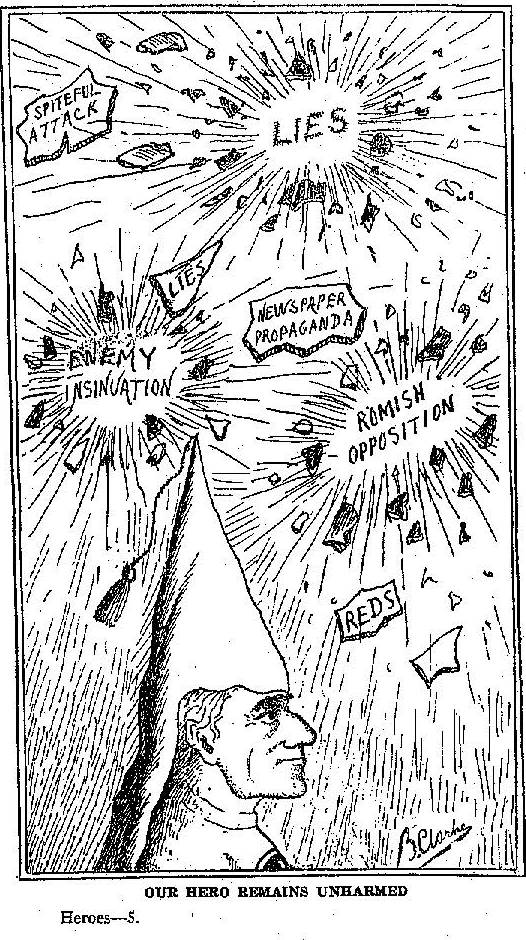
From Heroes of the Fiery Cross 1928.

From Heroes of the Fiery Cross 1928.

Out of the Smoke Un-Americanism. From Heroes of the Fiery Cross 1928.

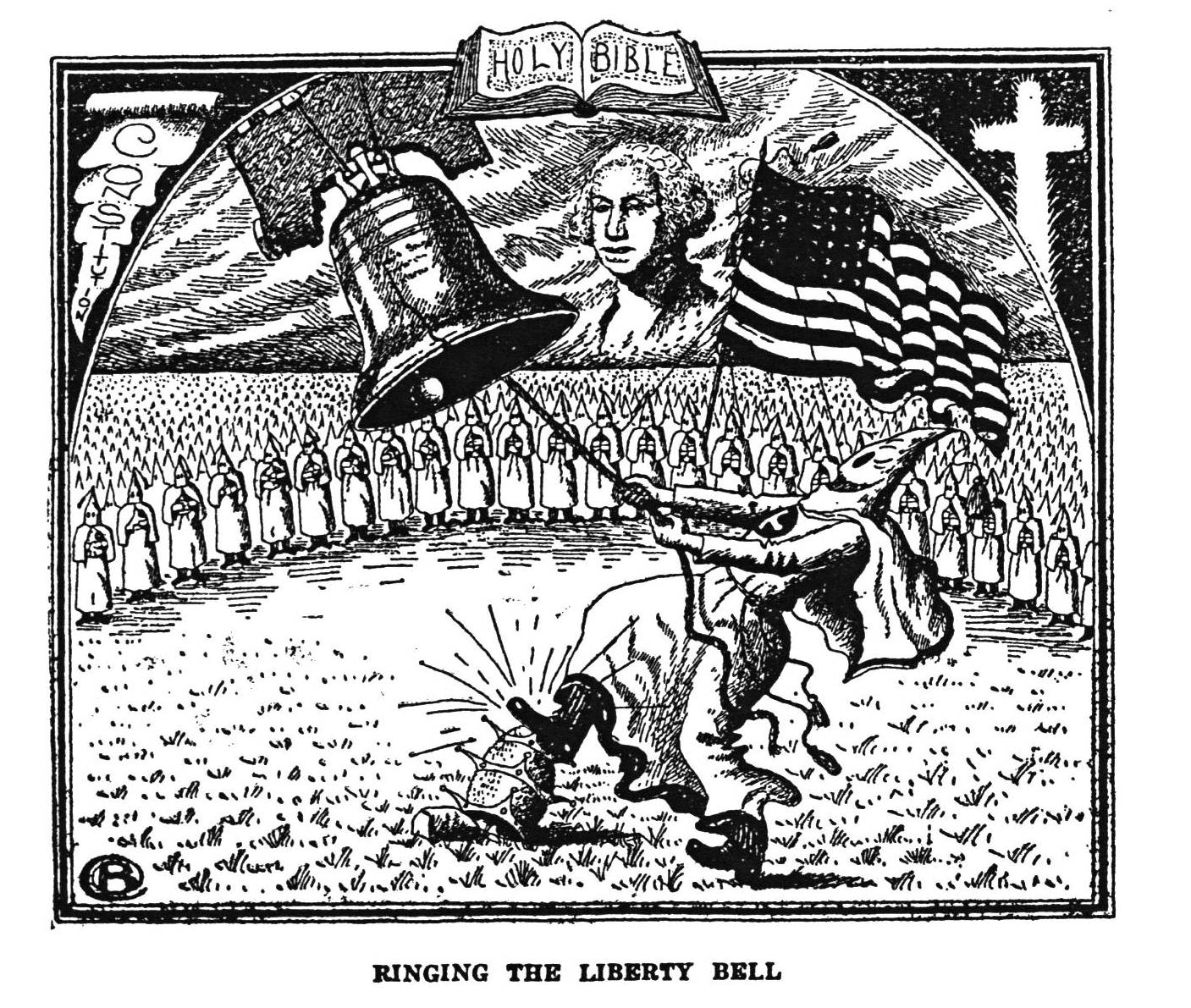
Ringing The Liberty Bell. From Klansmen: Guardians of Liberty 1926.

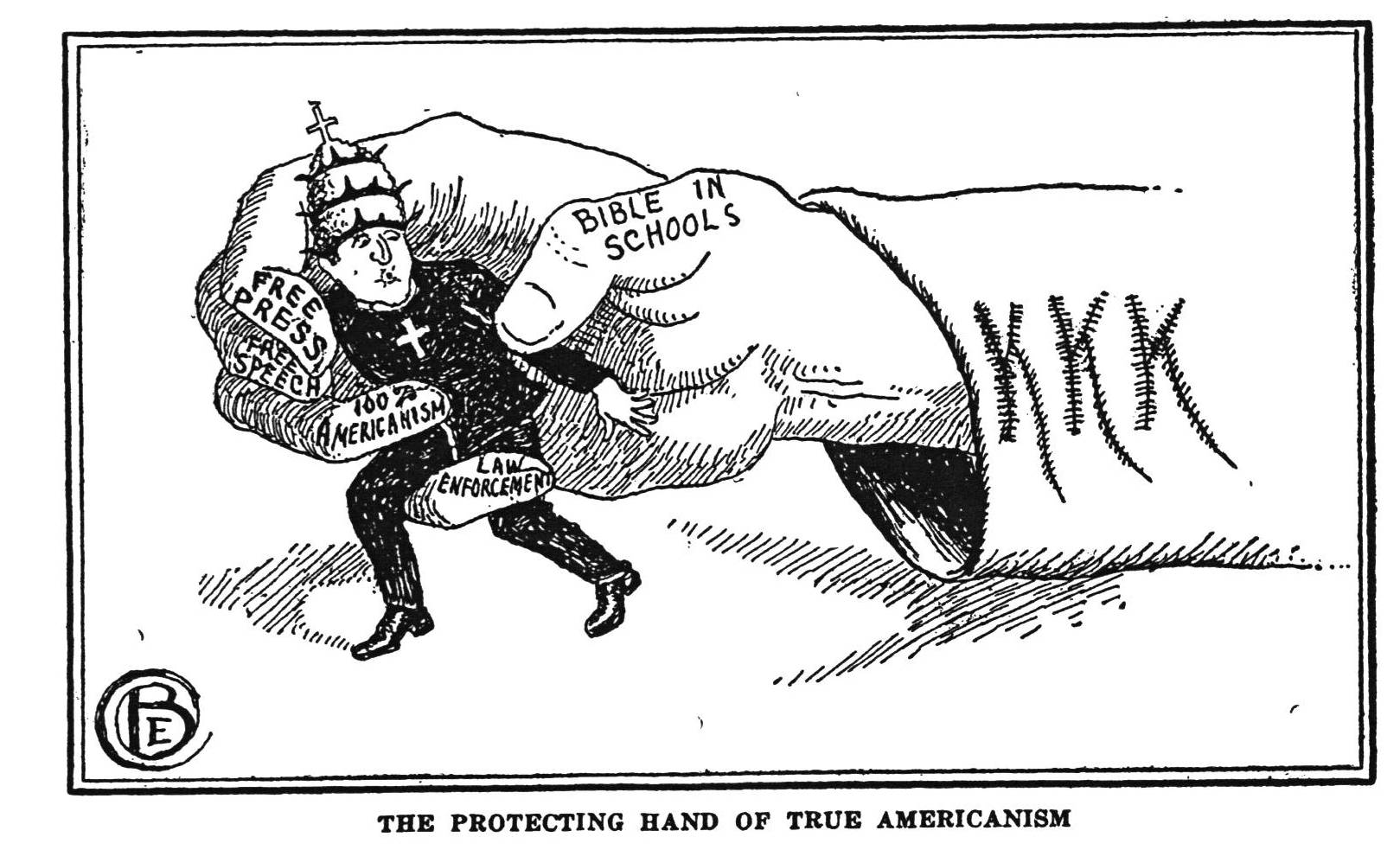
Protecting Hand of True Americanism. From Klansmen: Guardians of Liberty 1926.

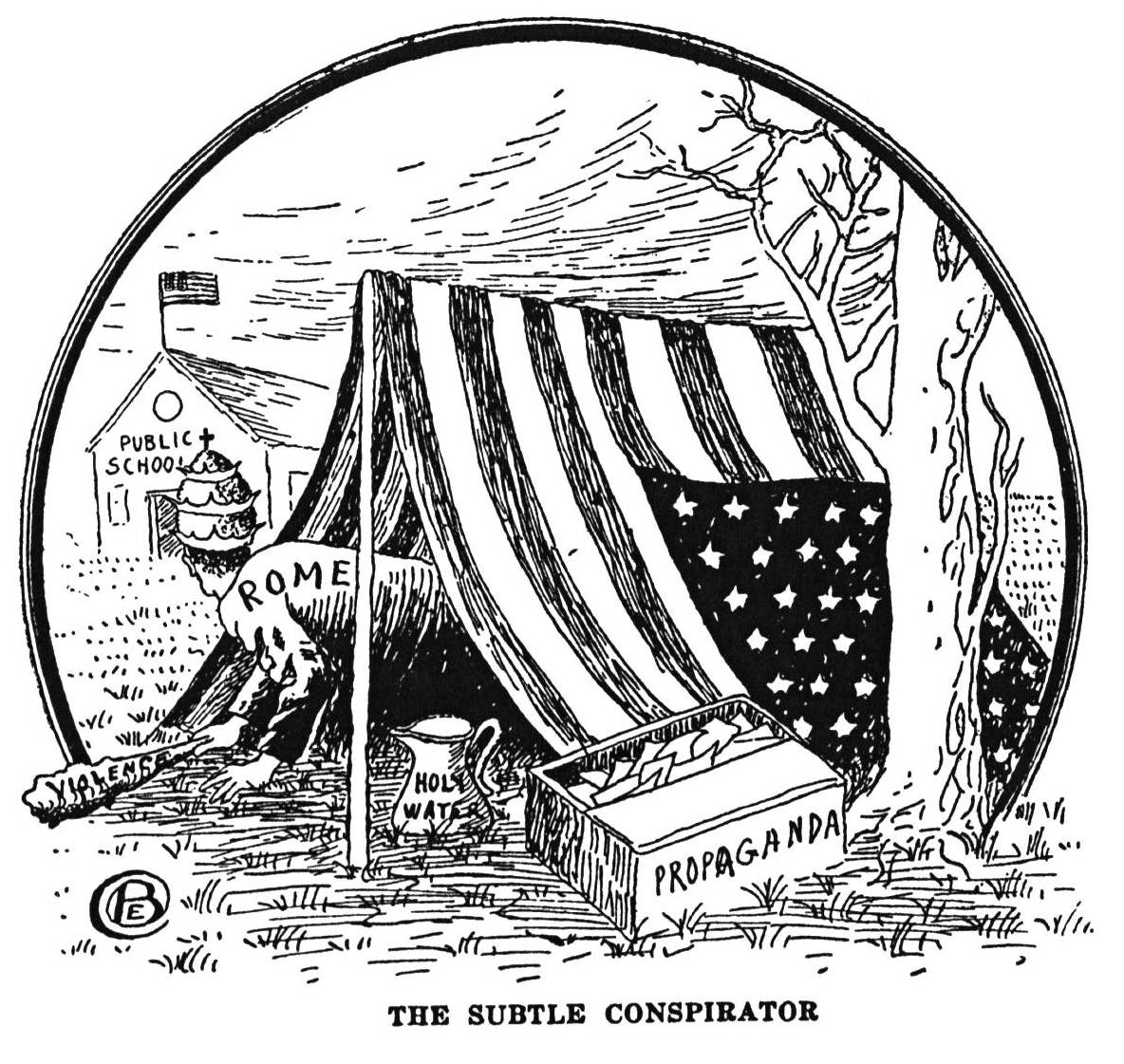
The Subtle Conspirator. from Klansmen: Guardians of Liberty

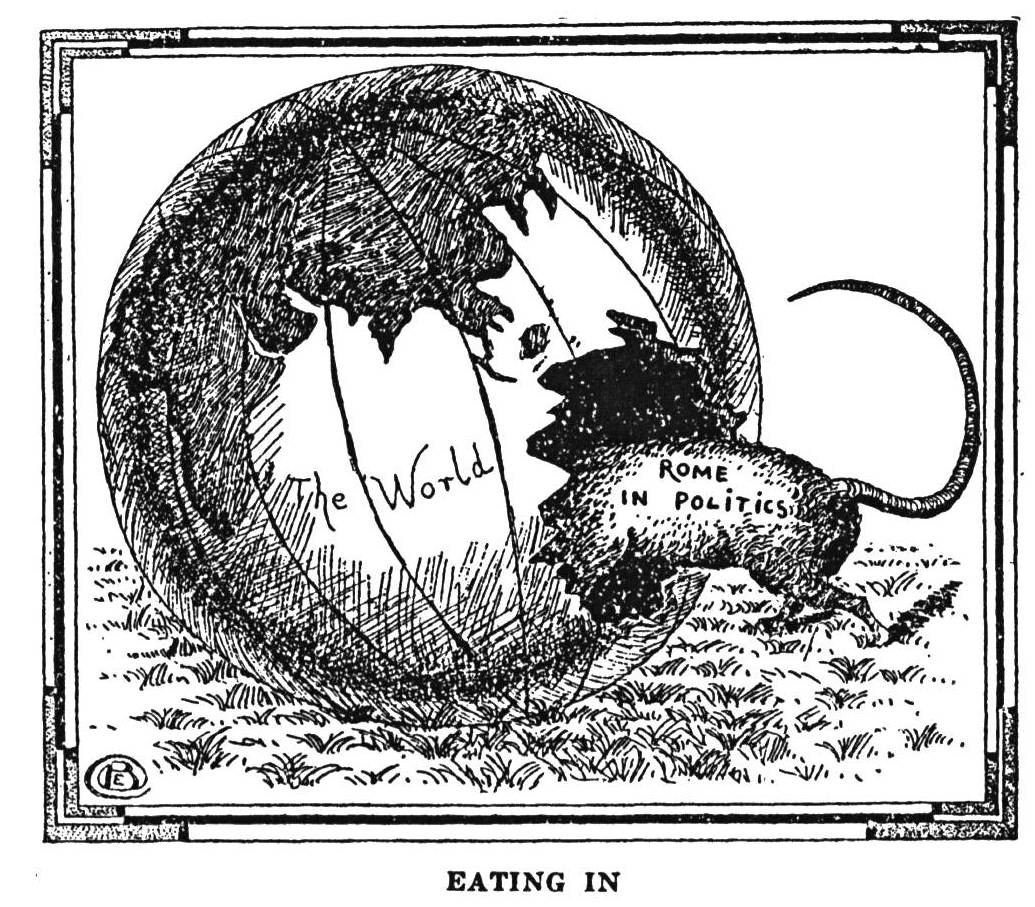
Eating In. from Klansmen: Guardians of Liberty

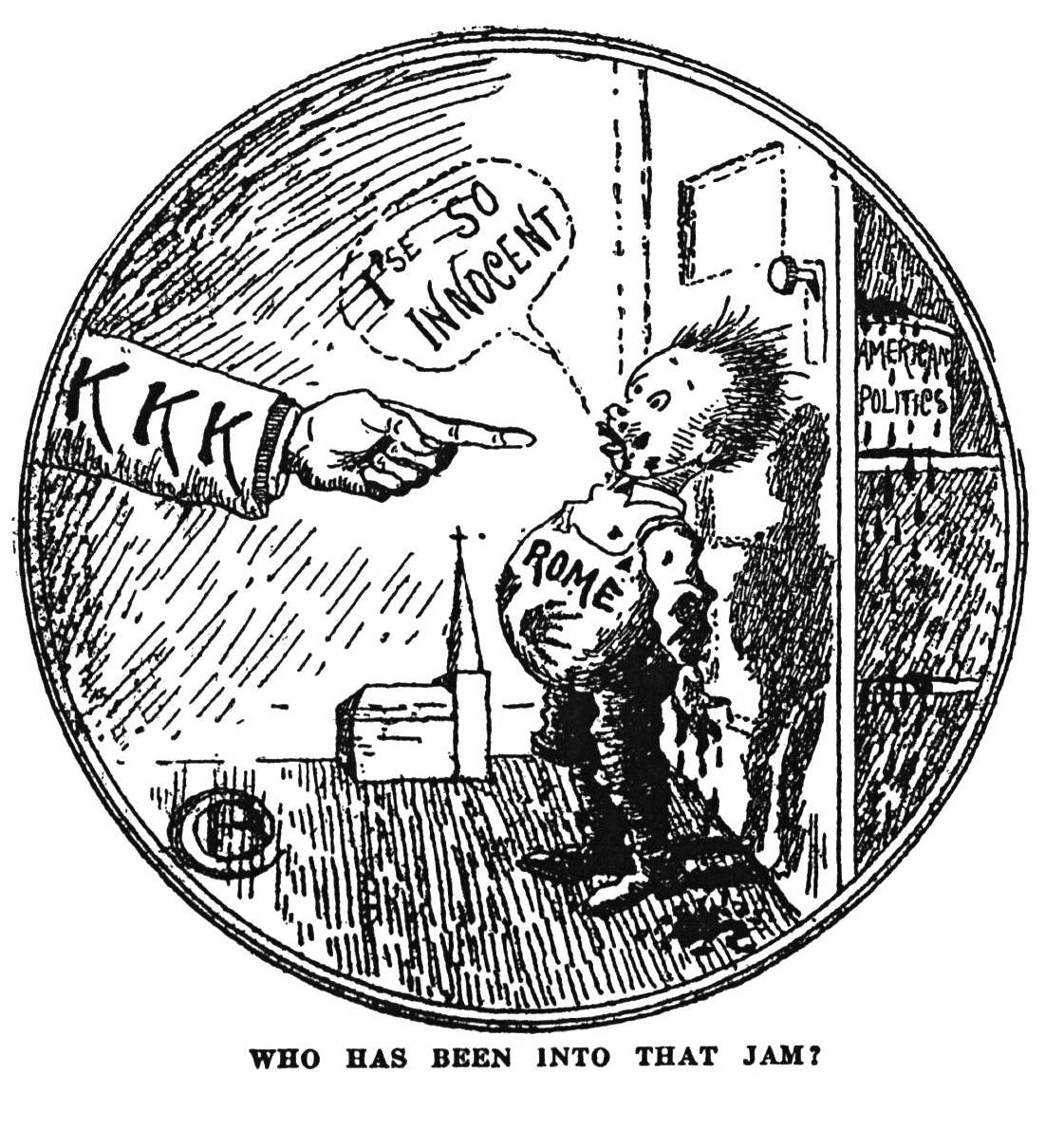
Who Has Been Into That Jam? Branford Clarke illustration in Klansmen: Guardians of Liberty

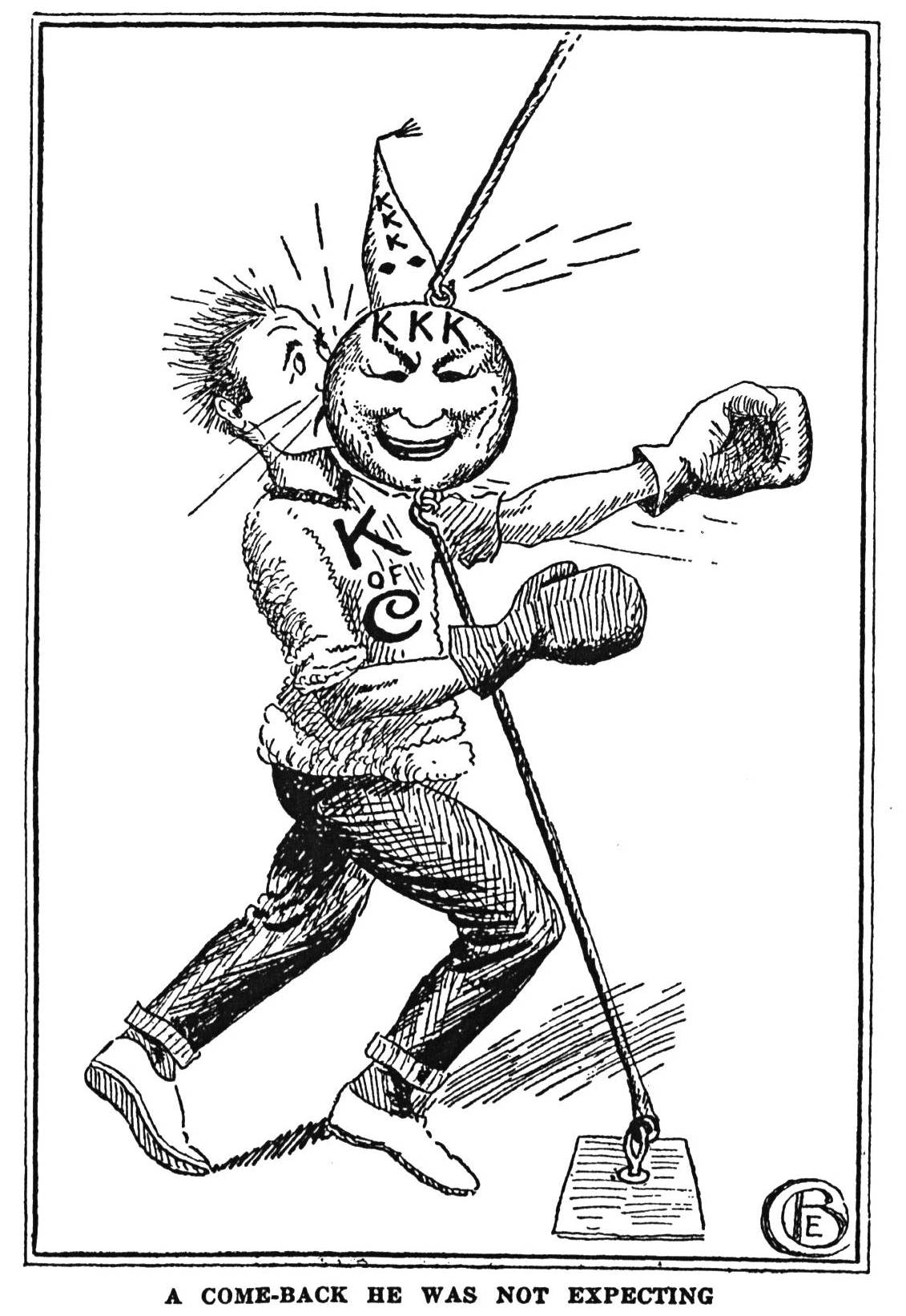
A Come-Back He Was Not Expecting. from Klansmen: Guardians of Liberty

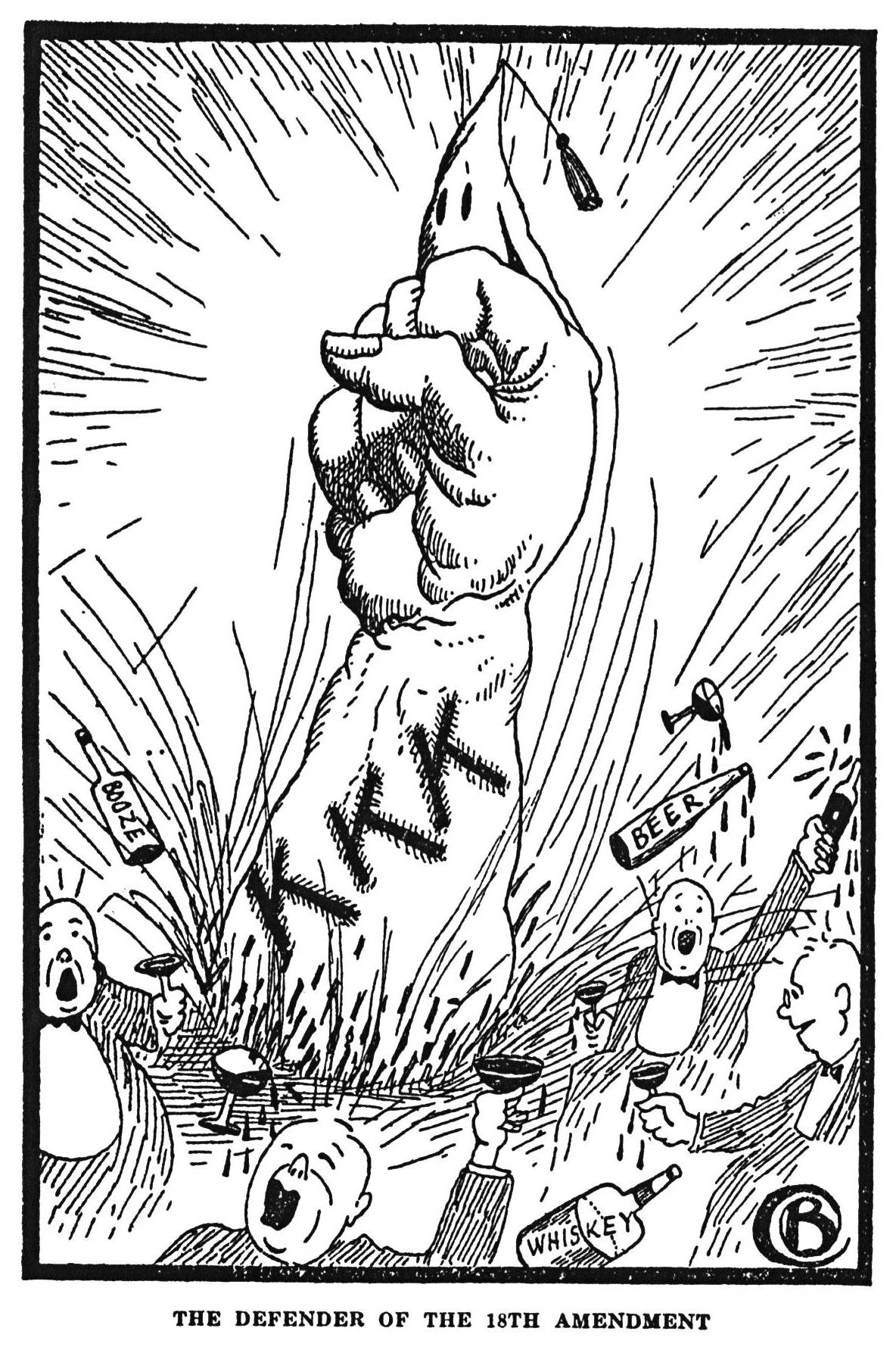
The Defender Of The 18th Amendment. from Klansmen: Guardians of Liberty 1926.

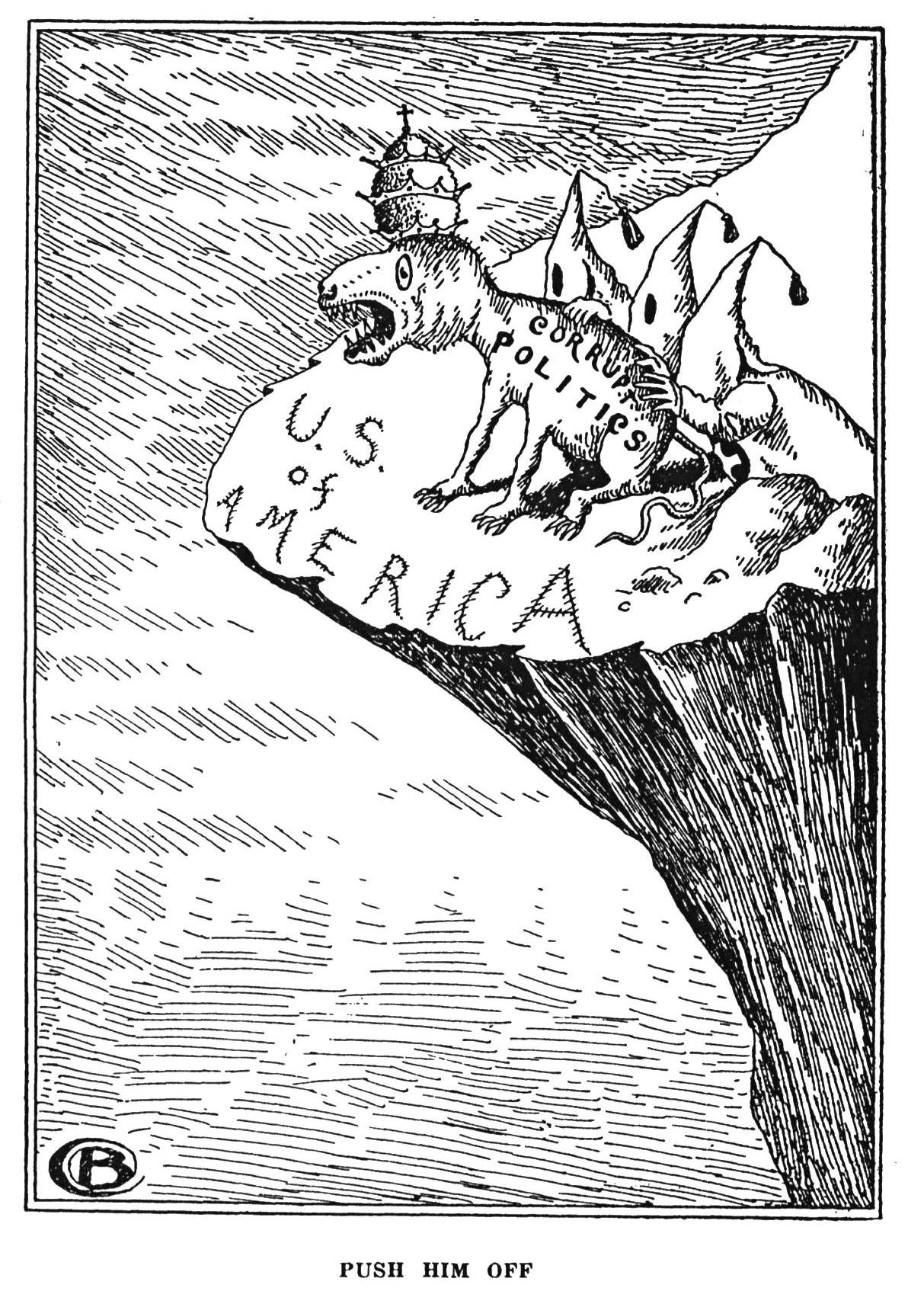
Push Him Off. from Klansmen: Guardians of Liberty 1926.

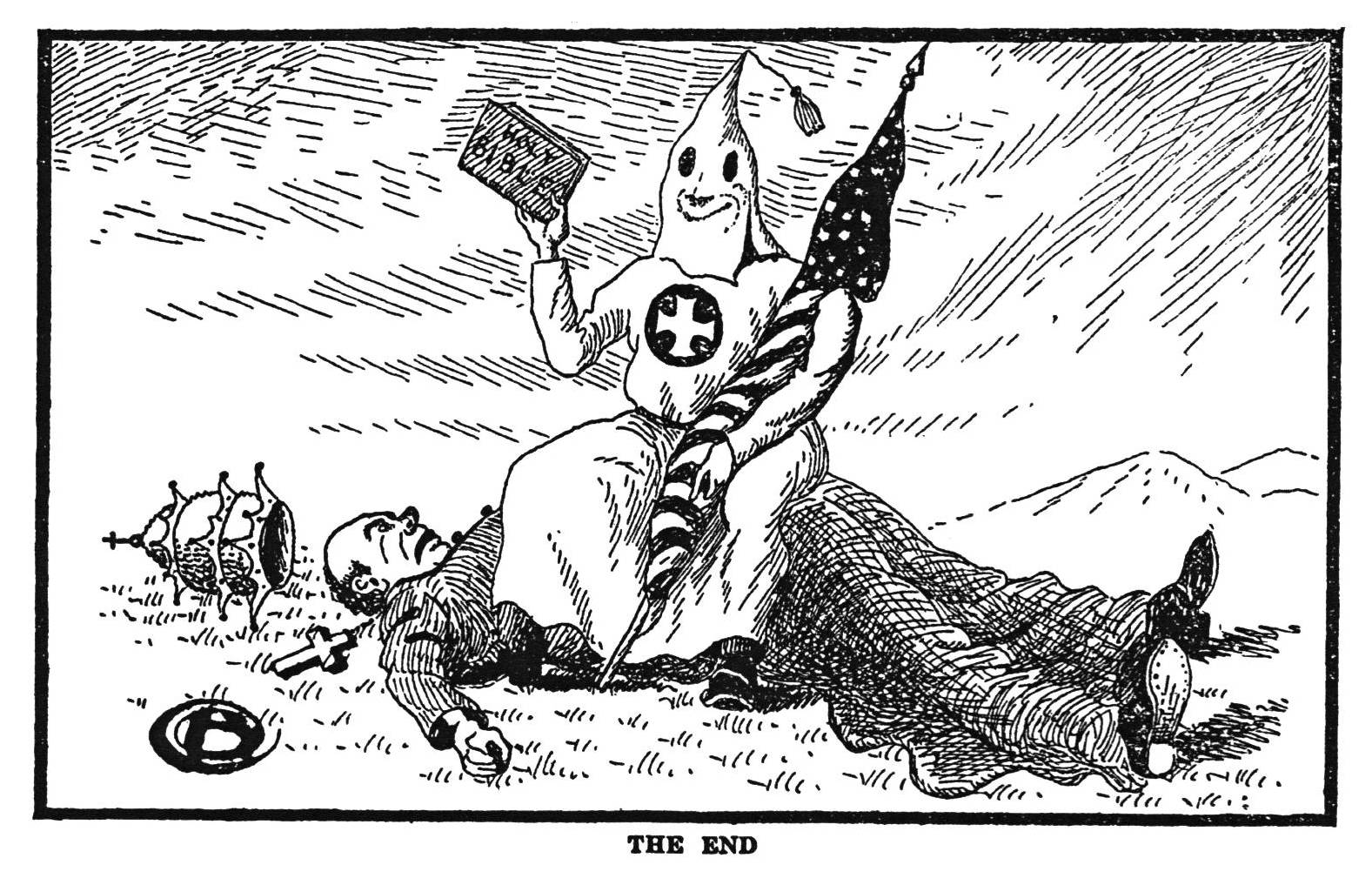
The End. from Klansmen: Guardians of Liberty

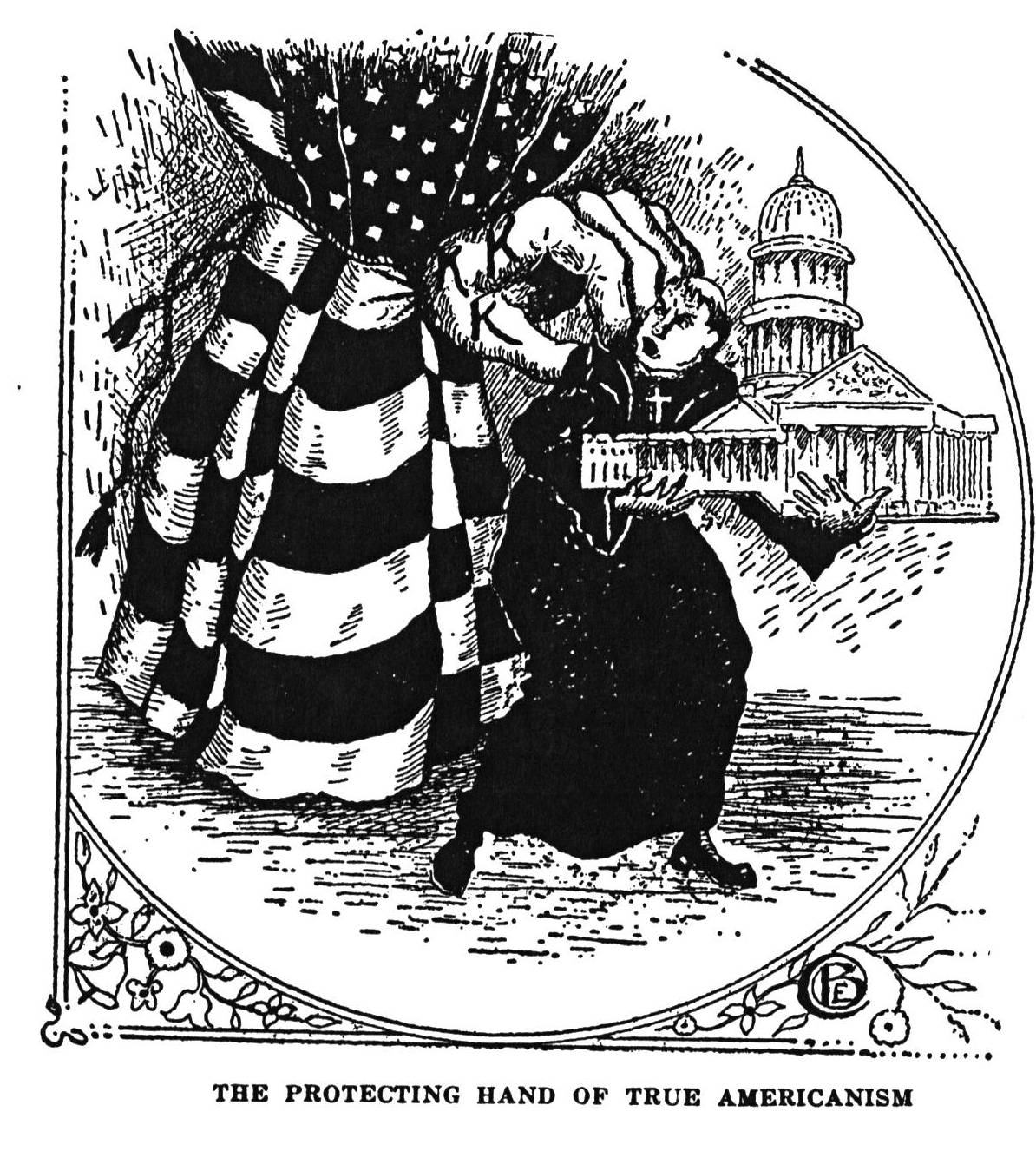
The Protecting Hand Of True Americanism. from Klansmen: Guardians of Liberty

Rome's Prison Houses Must be Opened For Inspection. from Klansmen: Guardians of Liberty

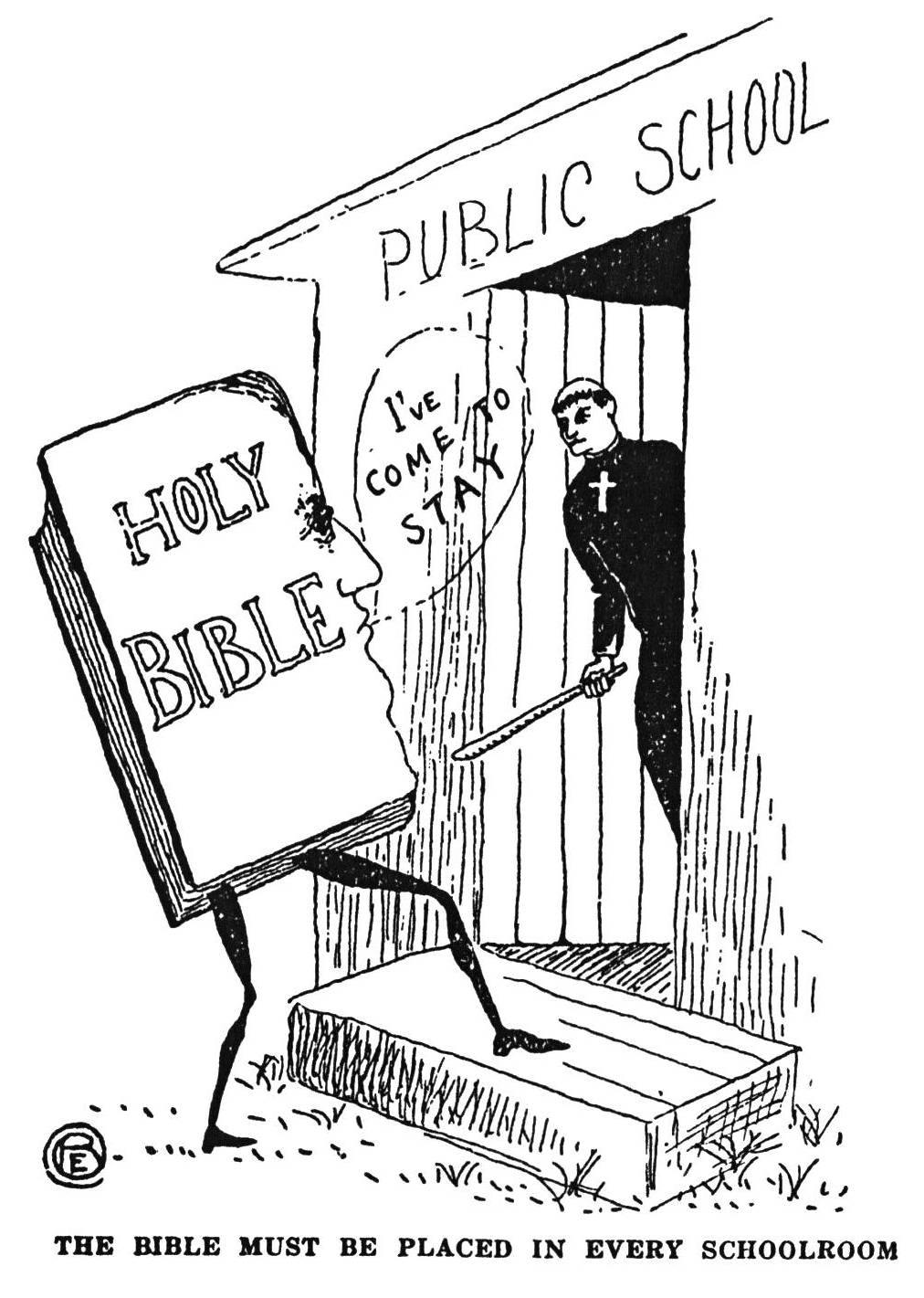
The Bible Must Be Placed In Every Schoolroom. from Klansmen: Guardians of Liberty

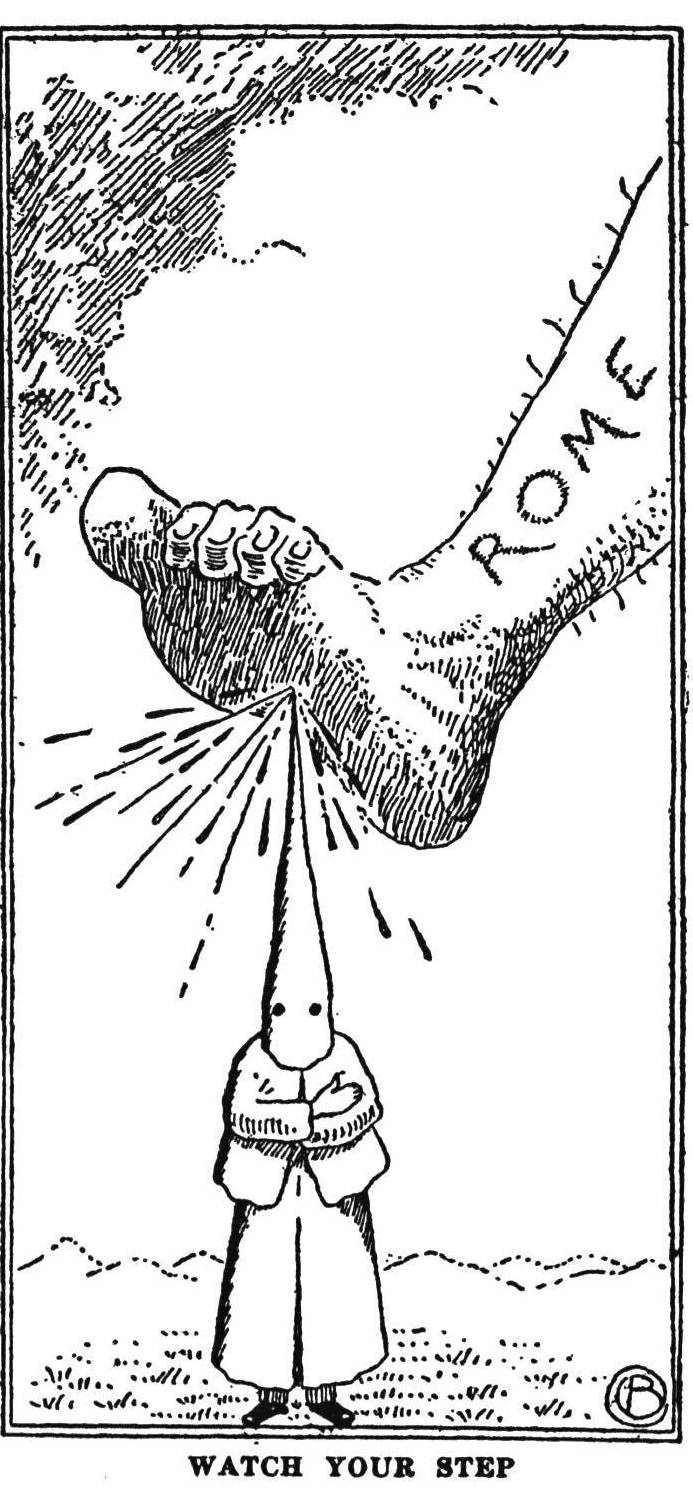
Watch Your Step. from Klansmen: Guardians of Liberty

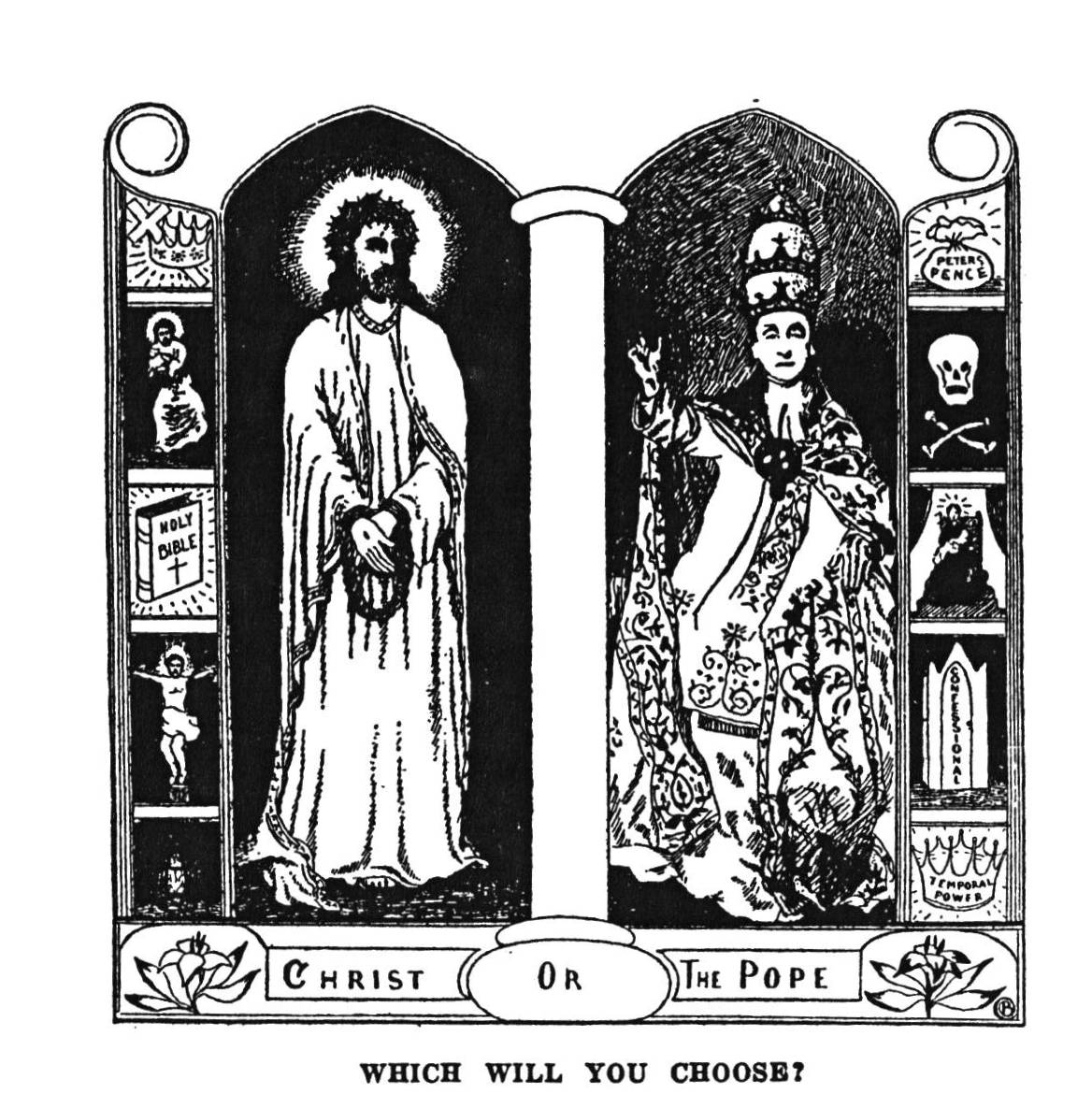
Which Will You Choose? from Klansmen: Guardians of Liberty

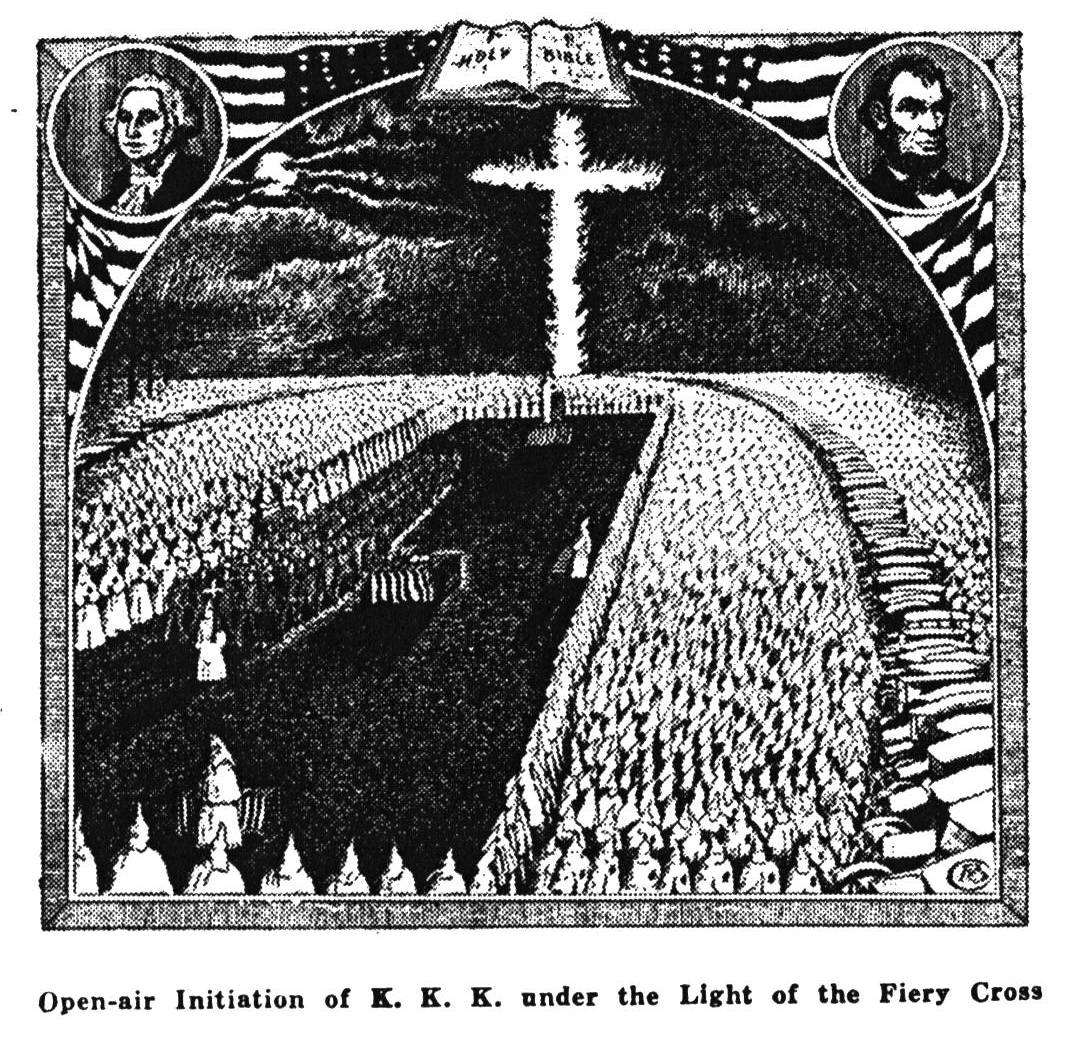
Open-air Initiation of K.K.K. under the Light of the Fiery Cross. From The Ku Klux Klan In Prophecy 1925.

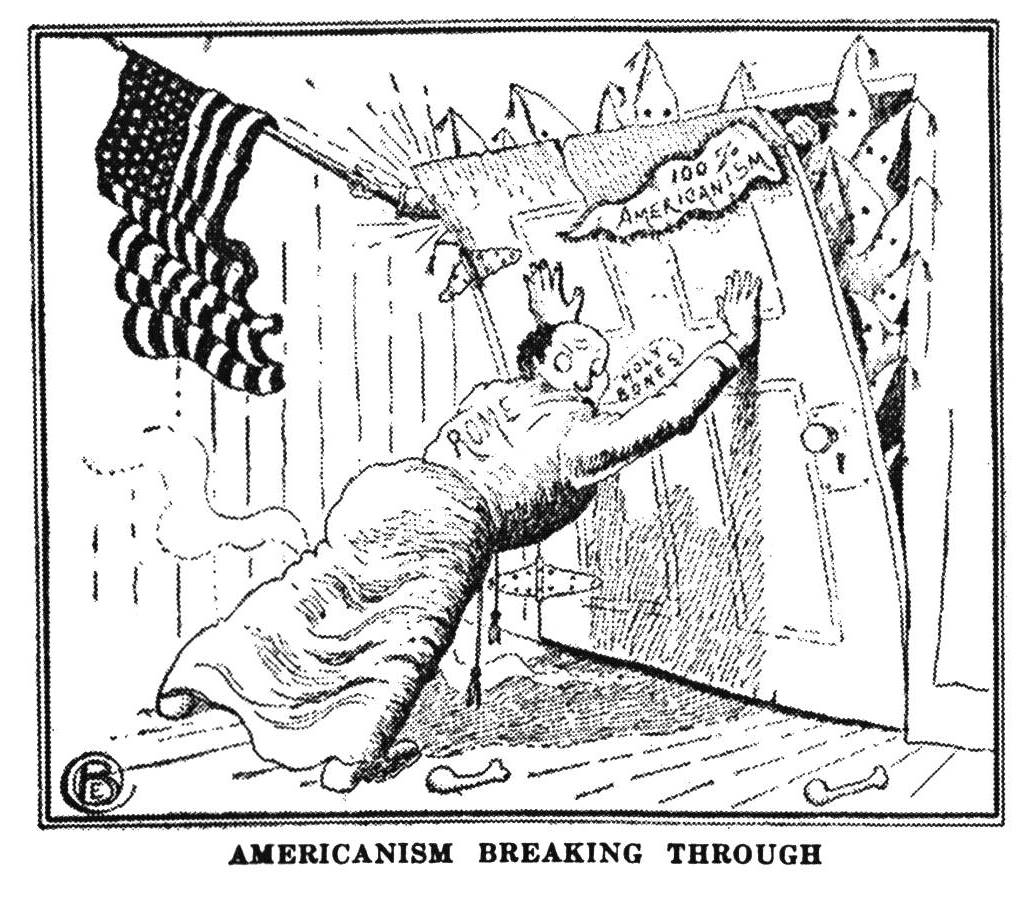
Americanism Breaking Through. From The Ku Klux Klan In Prophecy 1925.

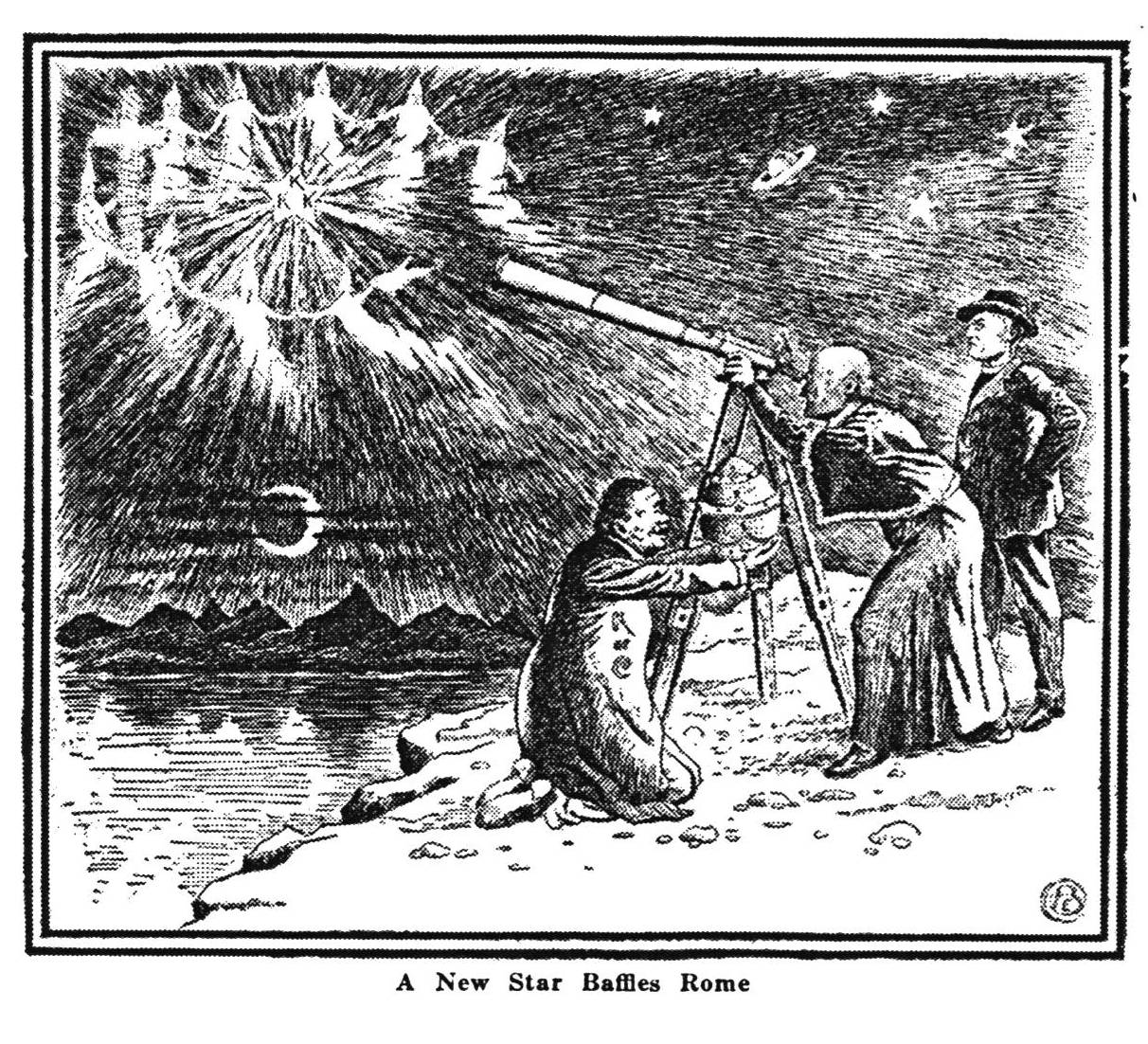
A New Star Baffles Rome. From The Ku Klux Klan In Prophecy 1925.

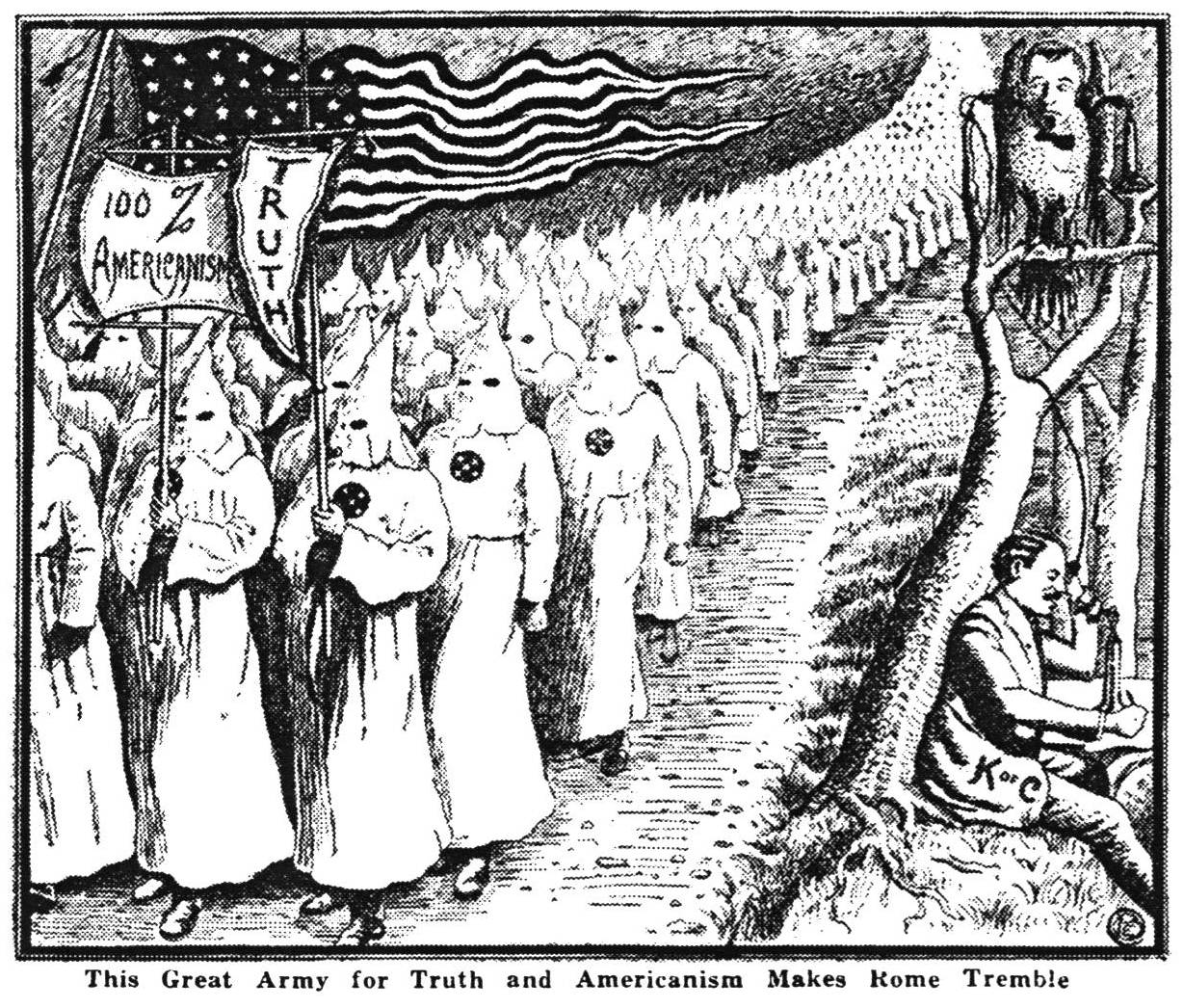
This Great Army for Truth and Americanism Makes Rome Tremble. From The Ku Klux Klan In Prophecy 1925.

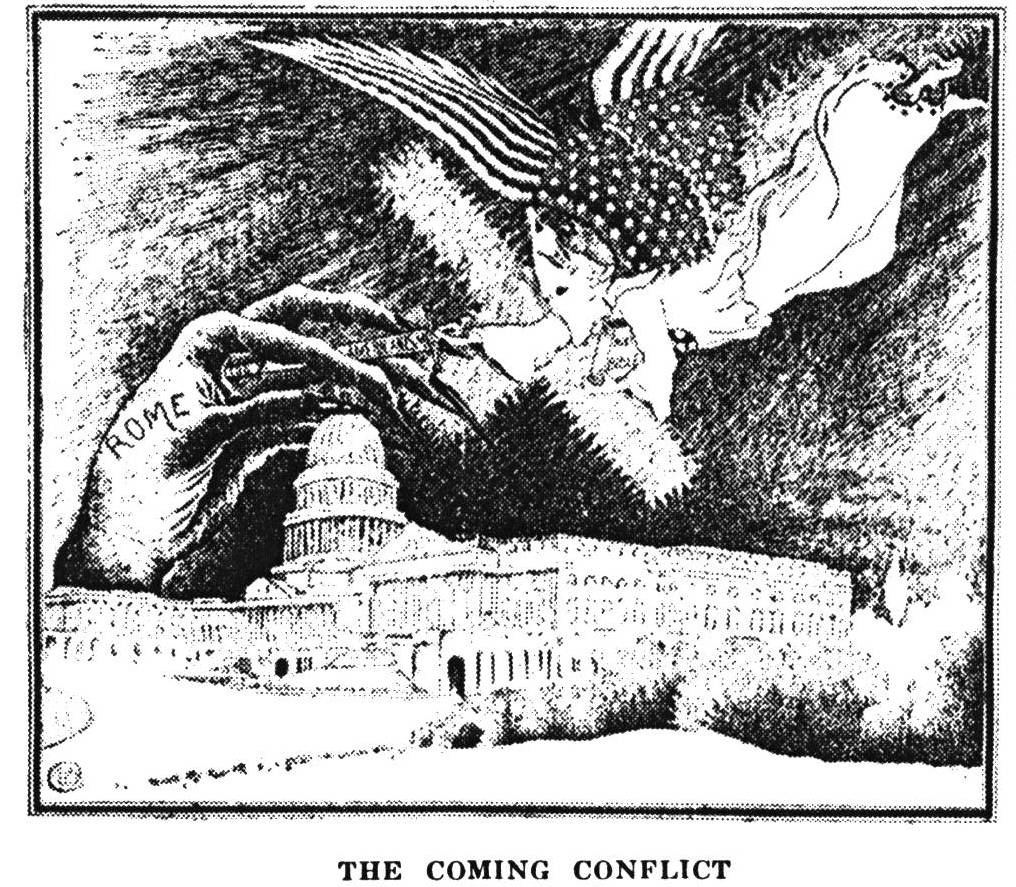
The Coming Conflict. From The Ku Klux Klan In Prophecy 1925.

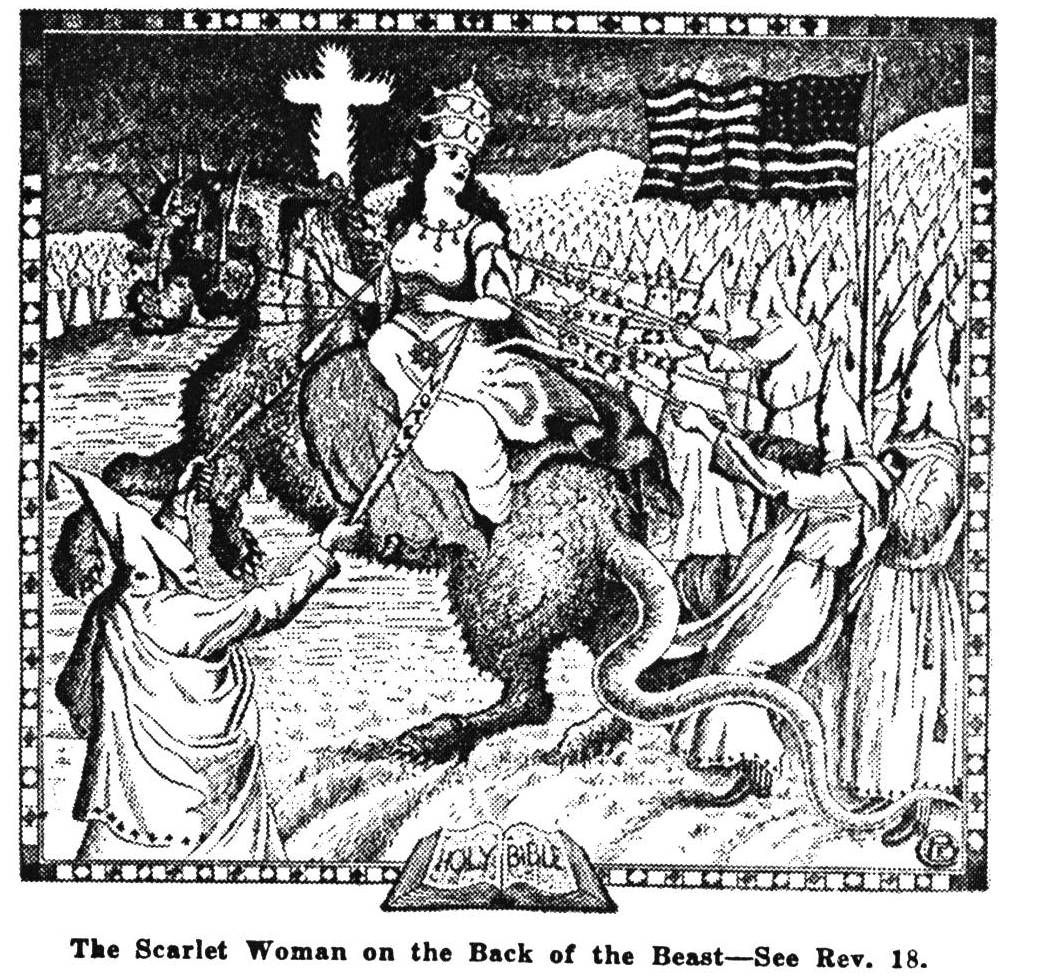
The Scarlet Woman on the Back of the Beast. From The Ku Klux Klan In Prophecy 1925.

The Rising Sun Will Melt The Snow Man. From The Ku Klux Klan In Prophecy 1925.

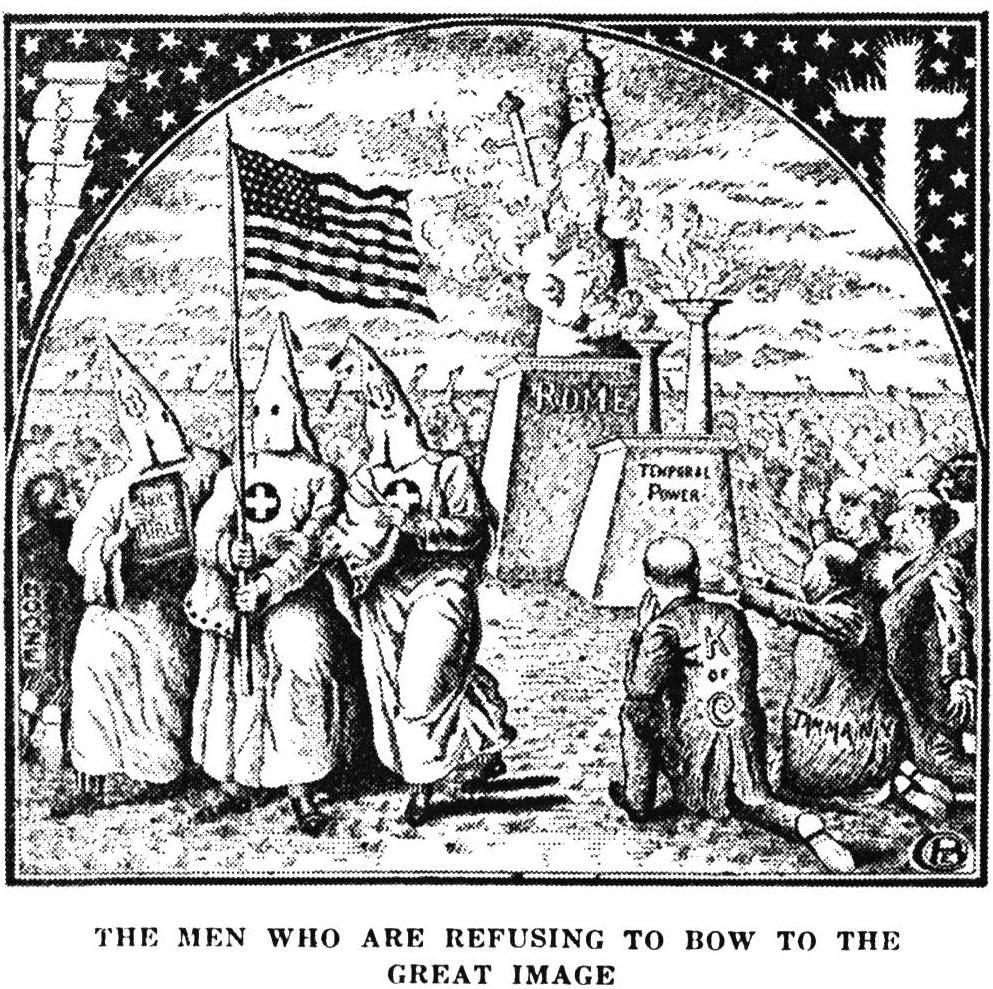
The Men Who Are Refusing to Bow to the Great Image. From The Ku Klux Klan In Prophecy 1925.

The Good Samaritan (K.K.K.) Caring For The Man Who Was Wounded, While His Persecutors Flee. From The Ku Klux Klan In Prophecy 1925.

The Ballot Will Bring The Walls Down. From The Ku Klux Klan In Prophecy 1925.

Jonah Cast Overboard. From The Ku Klux Klan In Prophecy 1925.

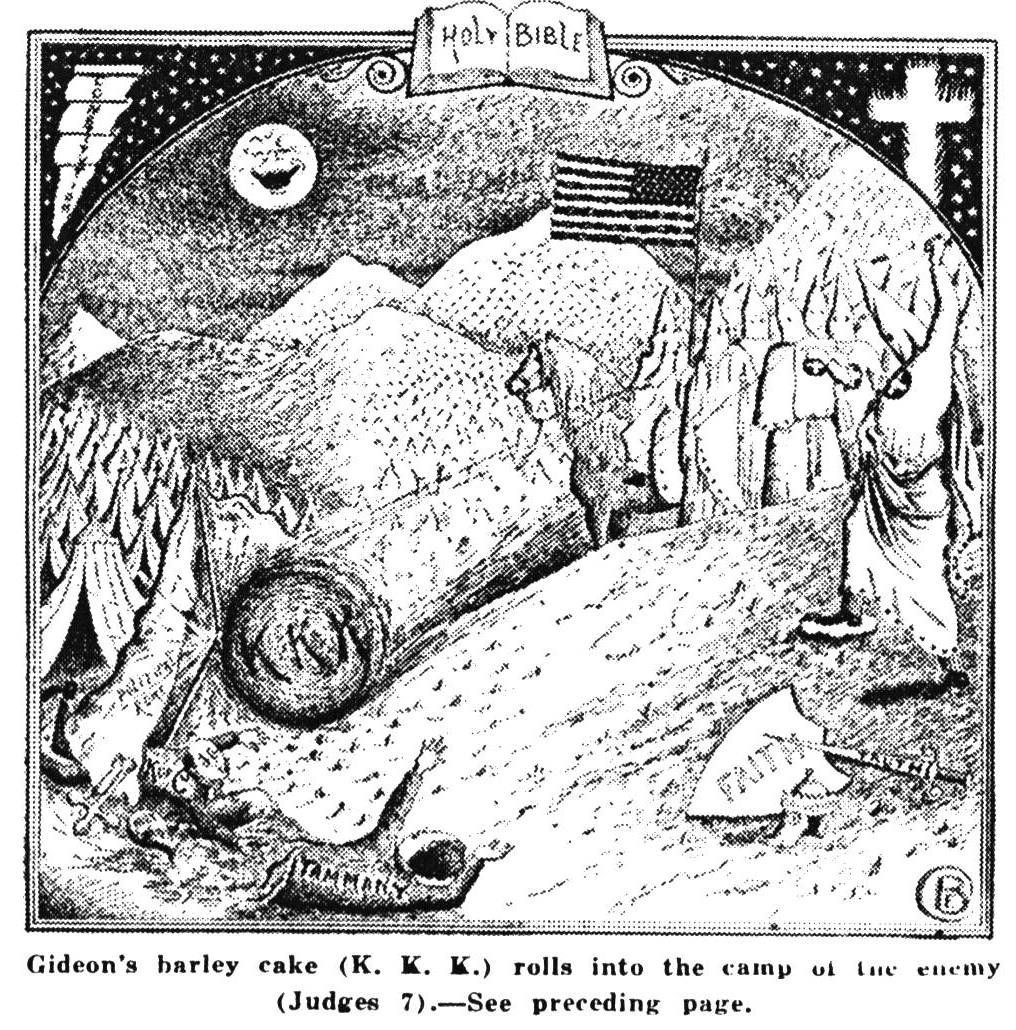
Gideon's barley cake (K.K.K.) rolls into the camp of the enemy. From The Ku Klux Klan In Prophecy 1925.

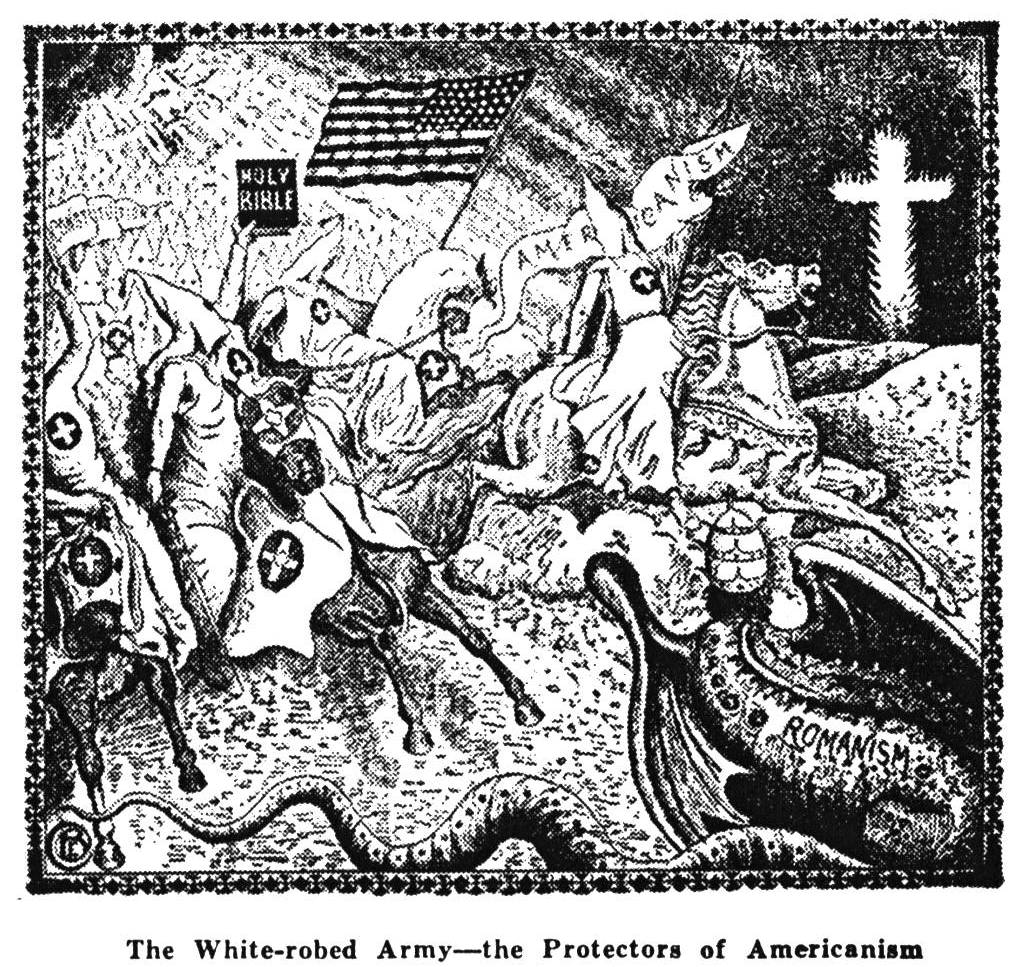
The White-robed Army—the Protectors of Americanism. From The Ku Klux Klan In Prophecy 1925.

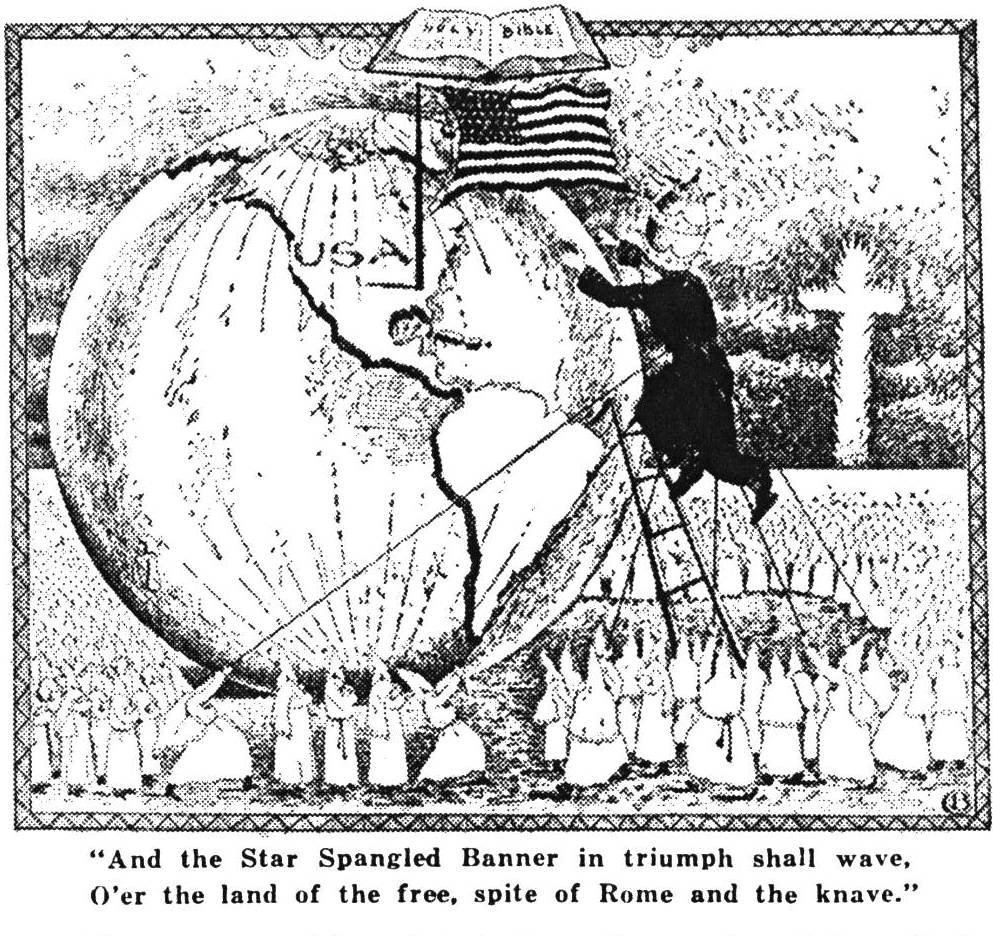
And the Star Spangled Banner in triumph shall wave, O'er the land of the free, spite of Rome and the Knave. From The Ku Klux Klan In Prophecy 1925.

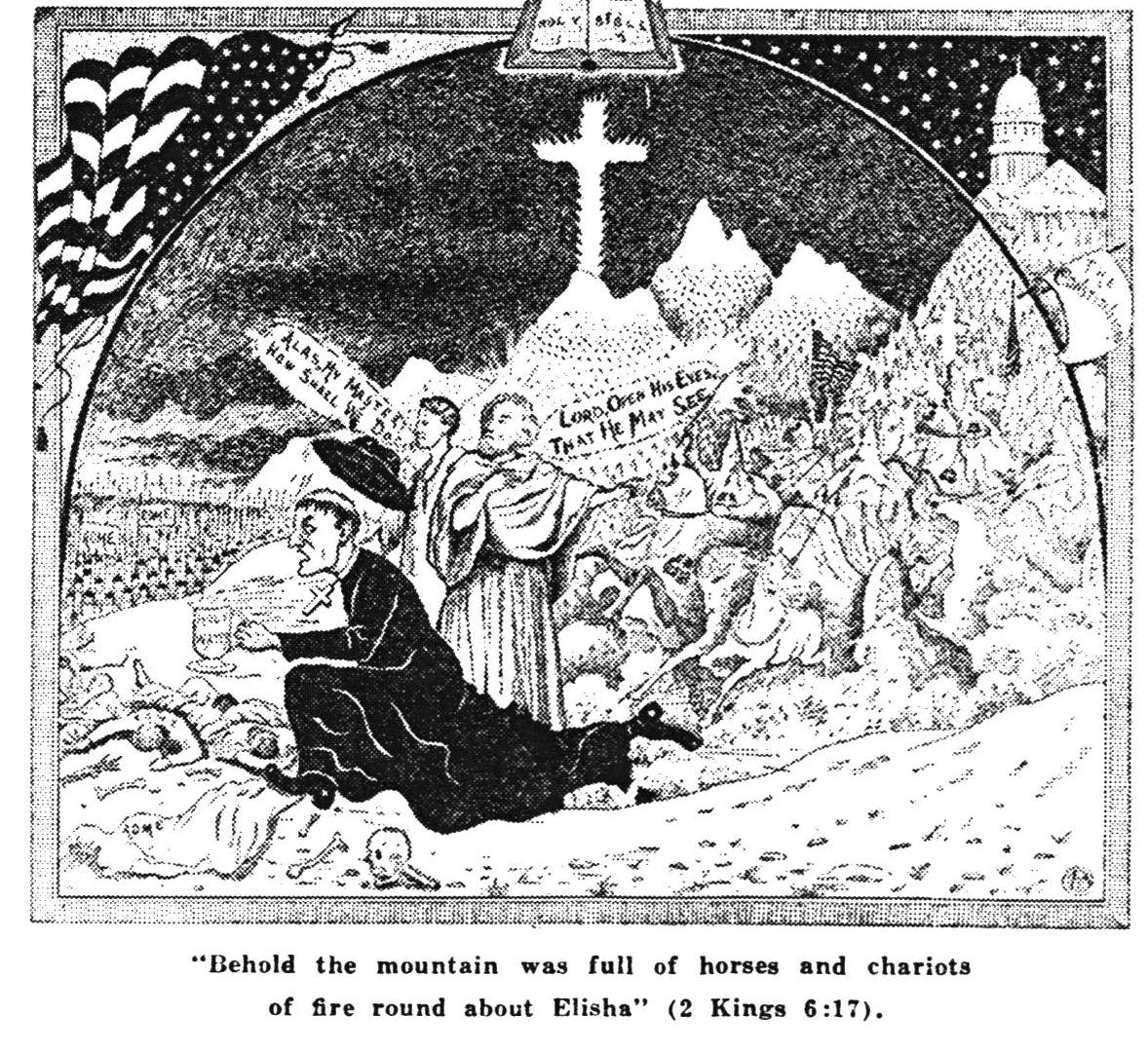
Behold the mountain was full of horses and chariots of fire round about Elisha. From The Ku Klux Klan In Prophecy 1925.

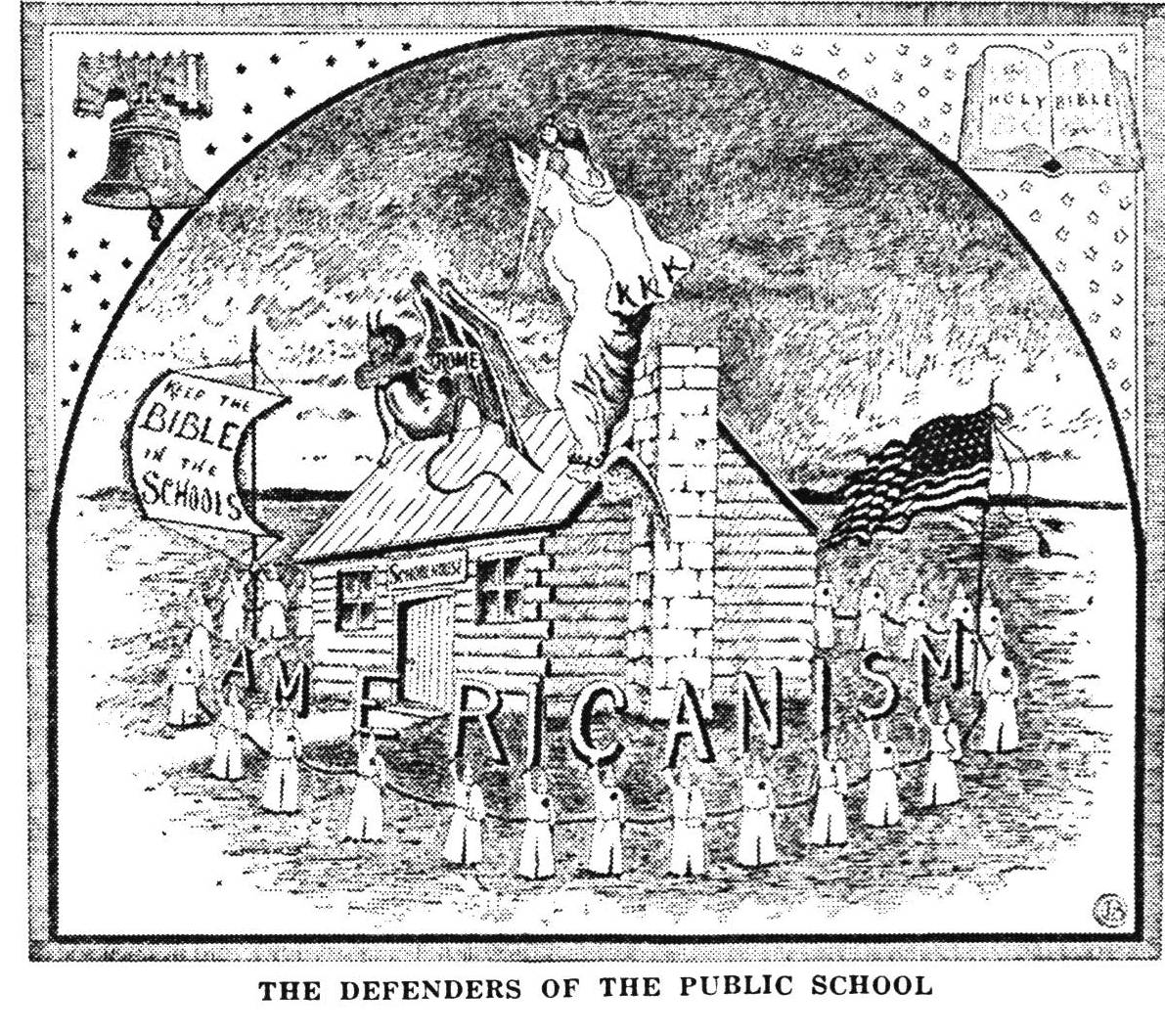
The Defenders of the Public School. From The Ku Klux Klan In Prophecy 1925.

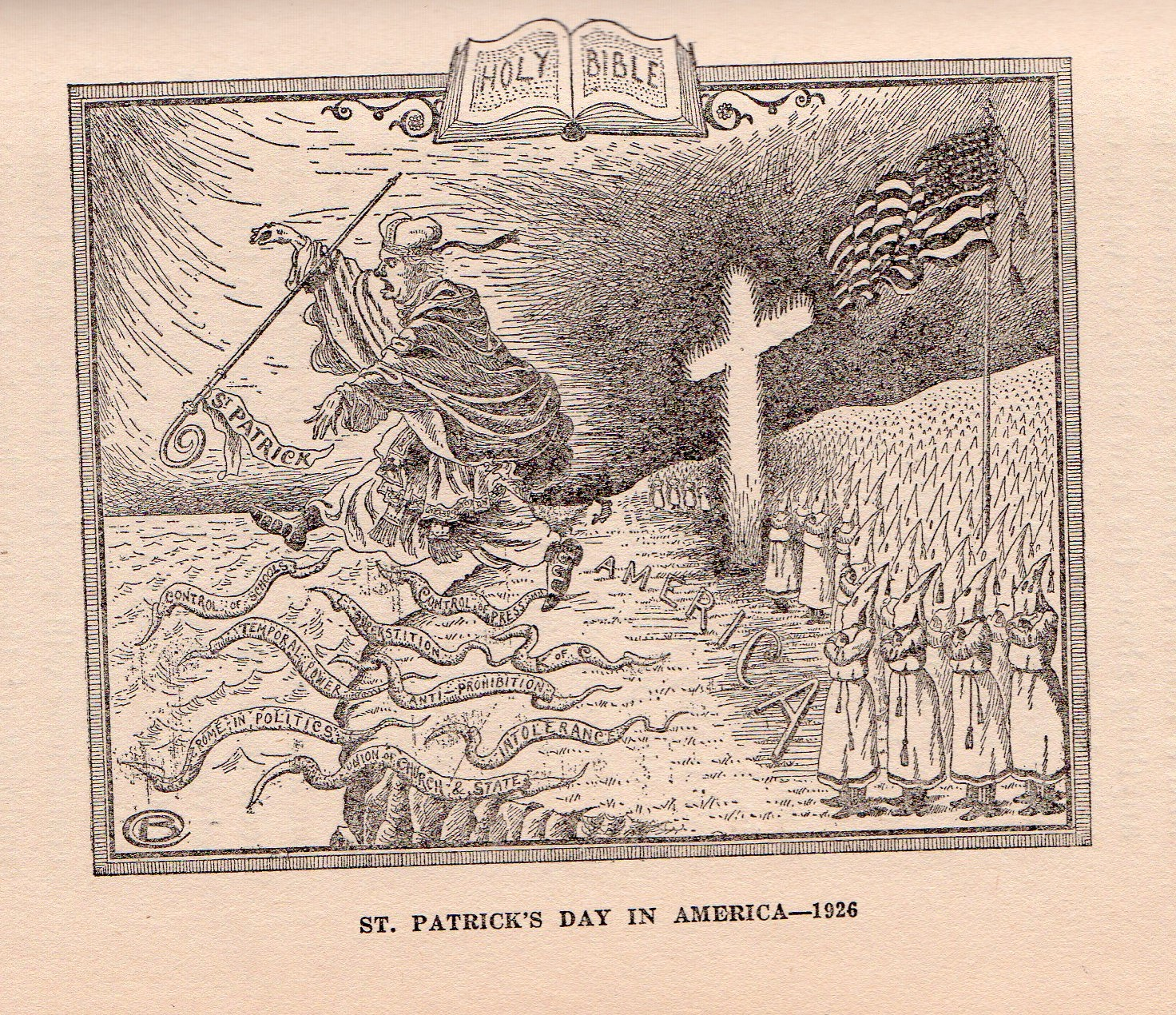
St. Patrick's Day in America From Klansmen: Guardians of Liberty 1927.
