= The Ku Klux Klan in Prophecy =

Book by Alma Bridwell White

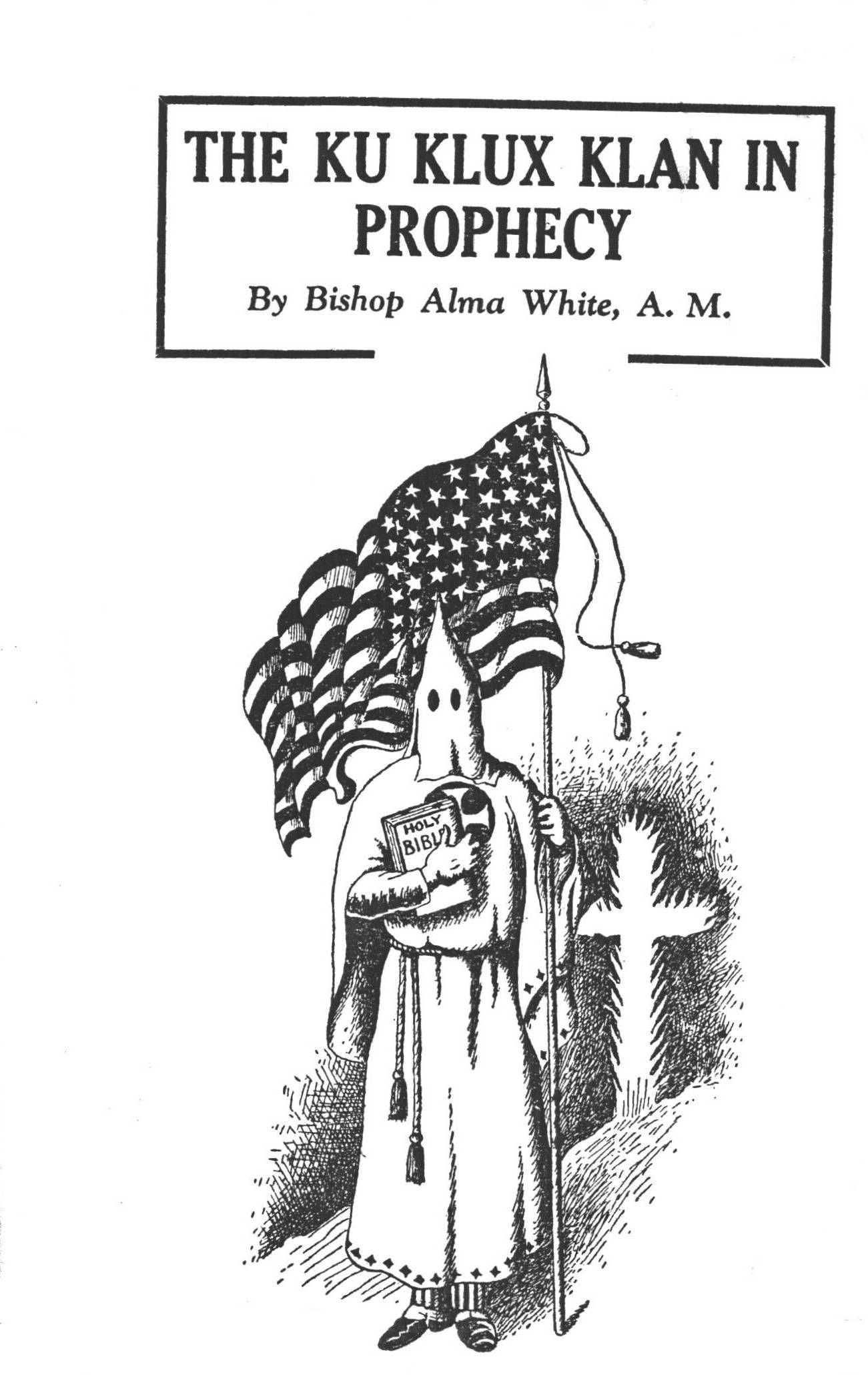
- Author: Alma Bridwell White
- Illustrator: Branford Clarke
- Subject: Anti-Catholicism, antisemitism, nativism and white supremacy
- Publisher: Pillar of Fire Church
- Publication date: 1925
- Pages: 144
- Preceded by: The Story of My Life, volume 1 (1919)
- Followed by: Klansmen: Guardians of Liberty (1926)

The unrepentant Hebrew is everywhere among us today as the strong ally of Roman Catholicism. ... To think of our Hebrew friends with their millions in gold and silver aiding the Pope in his aspirations for world supremacy, is almost beyond the grasp of ... The Jews in New York City openly boast that they have the money and Rome the power, and that if they decide to rule the city and state ... It is within the rights of civilization for the white race to hold the supremacy; and it is no injustice to the colored man. The white men of this country poured out their blood to liberate the colored people from the chains of slavery, and the sacrifice should be appreciated. ...

— Alma Bridwell White in The Ku Klux Klan in Prophecy in 1926

The Ku Klux Klan in Prophecy is a 144-page book written by Bishop Alma Bridwell White in 1925 and illustrated by Reverend Branford Clarke. In the book she uses scripture to rationalize that the Ku Klux Klan is sanctioned by God "through divine illumination and prophetic vision". She also believed that the Apostles and the Good Samaritan were members of the Klan. The book was published by the Pillar of Fire Church, which she founded, at their press in Zarephath, New Jersey. The book sold over 45,000 copies.

== History ==
White wrote more than 35 books and was the founder of the Pillar of Fire Church. She herself could not be a member of the Klan because she was a woman.

This book primarily espouses White's deep fear and hatred of the Roman Catholic Church while also promoting racism against African Americans, antisemitism, white supremacy, and women's equality. It was published in 1925 by the Pillar of Fire Church.

It is a compendium of essays and speeches by White, illustrations by Clarke, poems, prayers, and racial, anti-Catholic, and antisemitic slurs embedded in jokes and short stories. Most of this material was originally published between 1920 and 1924 in the pro-Ku Klux Klan political periodical The Good Citizen, one of numerous periodicals published by the Church. It is the first of three books White published to promote the KKK and her dogma of intolerance.

The book includes an introduction by Arthur Hornbui Bell, Grand Dragon of the New Jersey Ku Klux Klan. The introduction reads as follows:

This book brings out vividly the titanic struggle now taking place, not only in the United States, but over the entire world, and while at the present time the battle raging has not reached the point where bullets, swords and poison gas are the reasons used, the time will soon arrive when the Roman Catholic craving for world-power will, if not checked, cause a revival of a religious war that will be far more disastrous than the late World War.

.

The book also includes essays with titles such as "Great Klan Victory in the Election of 1924," "Enemies of the Ku Klux Klan Stricken with Blindness," "Papal Contention for Rulership of the World," "Bow or Burn," and "The Ku Klux Klan and Women's Causes."

She authored two more books on the Klan: Klansmen: Guardians of Liberty in 1926, and Heroes of the Fiery Cross in 1928. White republished the Klan books as a three-volume set in 1943, three years before her death and 21 years after her initial association with the Klan, under the title Guardians of Liberty. The set contained seven chapters from The Ku Klux Klan in Prophecy and one from the 1928 Heroes of the Fiery Cross.

== Sample illustrations ==
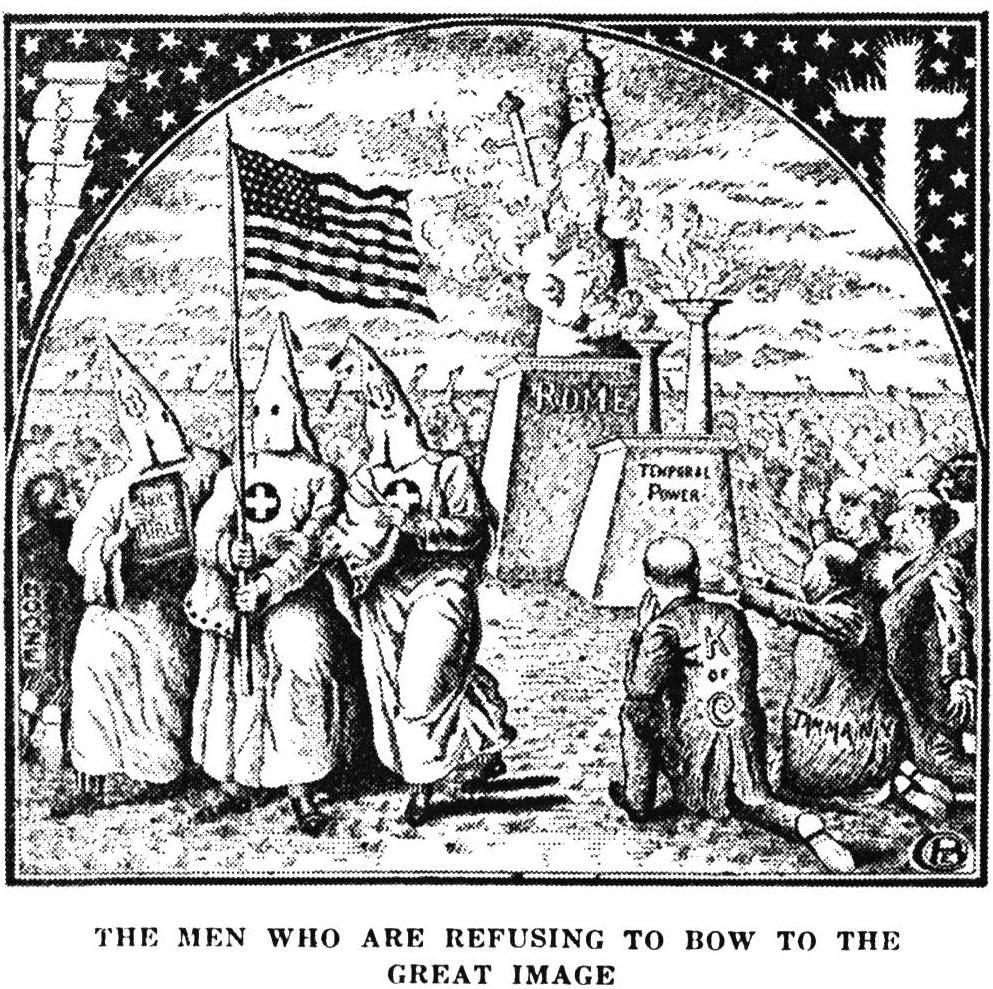

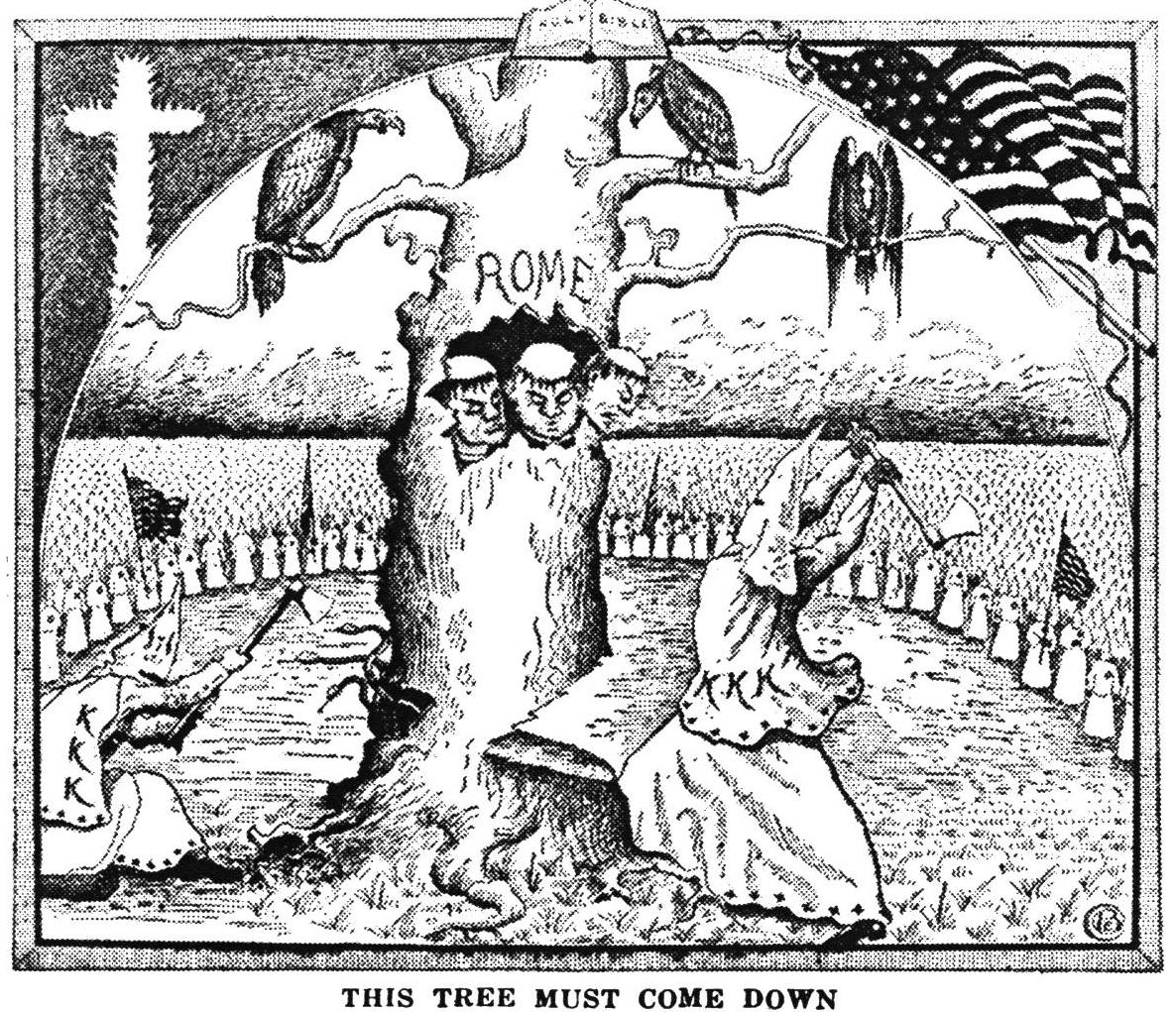
