= Clan (disambiguation) =

A clan is a group of people united by kinship and descent. It may refer to:

- Clan (African Great Lakes), a unit of social organisation
- Chinese clan association, formed by Overseas Chinese based on dialect groups or family names
- Irish clan, an Irish family group with a common surname
- Japanese clans. a Japanese family group with a common surname
- Scottish clan, a Scottish family group with a common surname

Clan(s) may also refer to:

== Arts and entertainment ==
- Clans (BattleTech), in the fictional BattleTech universe
- Clans (board game), a prehistoric-themed German-style board game
- Clans (game), a 1999 action RPG.
- Clan (TV channel), a children- and youth-oriented Spanish TV channel.
- Clan (TV series), a Flemish TV series
- Clan (video gaming), a group of players who regularly play together in a multi-player game
- Glasgow Clan An ice hockey team from Glasgow, Scotland who compete in the Elite Ice Hockey League.

== Other uses ==
- Clan (car), a British sports car manufacturer, producer of the Clan Crusader
- Clans, Alpes-Maritimes, a commune of the Alpes-Maritimes département in France
- Clans, Haute-Saône, a commune of the Haute-Saône département in France
- Clan Class, a Highland Railway steam locomotive
- Clan Line, a British shipping firm of the 19th and 20th centuries
- Protein clan, a superfamily of proteins, usually proteases
- Simon Fraser Clan, the varsity sport teams for Simon Fraser University
- The collective noun for hyenas

== See also ==
- The Clan (disambiguation)
- Clansman (disambiguation)
- Klan (disambiguation)
- Ku Klux Klan
- Llan (placename element)
