= The Clan =

The Clan may refer to:

- A clan
- The Clan (Liberal Party of Australia), a group within the Liberal Party
- The Clan – Tale of the Frogs, 1984 Finnish film
- The Clan (1920 film), a German silent film
- The Clan (2005 film), an Italian film
- The Clan (2015 film), an Argentine film
- Ku Klux Klan

== See also ==
- Clan (disambiguation)
