= Black Klansman =

Black Klansman may refer to:

- The Black Klansman, a 1966 film directed by Ted V. Mikels; also called I Crossed the Color Line
- Black Klansman, a 2014 book by Ron Stallworth, a black police officer who infiltrated the Ku Klux Klan in 1979
  - BlacKkKlansman, a 2018 film directed by Spike Lee based on Stallworth's book
- Black-robed klansman, a member of the Knighthawks, the security order of the Ku Klux Klan

== See also ==
- Black Legion (film)
- Black Legion (political movement)
- Clansman (disambiguation)
