= Klan-Tofla =

- Commune (defunct)
- Location in Ivory Coast
- Coordinates: 6°56′N 5°39′W
- Country: Ivory Coast
- District: Sassandra-Marahoué
- Region: Marahoué
- Department: Bouaflé
- Sub-prefecture: Bouaflé
- Time zone: UTC+0 (GMT)

Klan-Tofla was a commune in central Ivory Coast. It was in the sub-prefecture of Bouaflé, Bouaflé Department, Marahoué Region, Sassandra-Marahoué District.

Klan-Tofla was a commune from March 2008 until March 2012, when it became one of 1,126 communes nationwide that were abolished.
