= Clansman 30 =

30-foot class of narrow-beam full-keel yacht

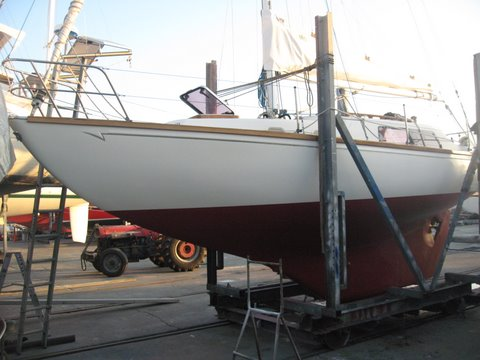
Clansman 30

The Clansman 30 is a 30-foot class of narrow-beam full-keel yacht manufactured on the New South Wales Central Coast of Australia. Production ran from 1965 through 1985, with hull numbers from 1 to 108. The last Clansman was launched in 1994.

The Clansman was one of the first fiberglass production yachts in Australia and arguably was one of the strongest.

It is an exceptional sea boat that has stood the test of time in performance in adverse conditions, with one of the class (hull number 7) having been sailed from Australia to the east coast of the US. An active class association still exists.

== Production ==
The Clansman was laid up extremely thick, with solid glass-reinforced plastic (GRP) hull and GRP and plywood deck. Layup was by chopper gun on a female mould, creating an interior surface that needed little additional finishing. The interior furniture was made of plywood and glassed in place.

The Clansman 30 was designed and built by East Coast Yachts in Gosford NSW. The builder was Bruce Fairlie who owned and operated the business.

== Design features ==
Although rough by today's standards, the fit out proved functional and strong.

The Clansman 30 was one of many yachts Bruce Fairlie built, however the Clansman was the only yacht Fairlie designed himself. (Note: All other boats built by East Coast Yachts were designed by Peter Cole, another famous Australian yacht designer. The Peter Cole designs built by East Coast Yachts were the Contessa 25, Cole 43 and East Coast 31; all solid seagoing vessels.) While designed by Fairlie the Clansman has a very strong resemblance to the Elizabethan 29, an English yacht.

The interior layout was strongly influenced by trends in caravan design - Fairlie had previously been involved with building caravans. These features include a dinette that converts to a double berth, two-way doors that close between the toilet-forecabin-wardrobe-main cabin, and (for early models) a portable Esky under a lid in the benchtop, in place of a built-in icebox.

Fairlie brought a number of other innovative and highly effective features to the design. For instance, the forestay is bolted right through the hull and secured with a bolt hidden at the centre of a bronze casting of a thistle which becomes a feature of the bow. The shrouds and backstay are secured to u-bolts through the deck, eliminating the need for rigging screws. The u-bolts provide a compression packing that can be screwed down tight, and owners report that they seldom leak. The deck is moulded with a lip that turns up to fit inside the hull moulding, and after being glued and glassed in, the join is covered with a custom-designed vinyl moulding that eliminates the common problem of deck/hull leaks, and also serves as a practical rubbing strake. The mast is deck-stepped on an aluminium channel that sits above the two main internal bulkheads - a solution that allows easy passage below decks to the forecabin, while ensuring a solid base for the mast. Many of the boats were delivered with an outboard engine that was mounted in a cutout in the rear cockpit bench seat and could be removed and stowed below the cockpit - a configuration that was later adopted in other production yachts. These models were also delivered with an arch in the companionway cutout instead of a sliding hatchway, thus simplifying construction, retaining bulkhead strength and removing another possible source of leaks.
