= SS Empire Clansman =

Collier built in 1942 for the Ministry of War Transport

History
- Name: Empire Clansman (1942–48); Sheaf Field (1948–52); Corfield (1952–64); Spyros Amrenakis (1964–65)
- Owner: Ministry of War Transport (1942–49); Sheaf Steamship Company, Newcastle (1949–52); William Cory & Son Ltd, London (1952–64); M. Scufalos, Greece (1964–65)
- Operator: Stephenson Clarke & Associated Companies Ltd (1942–49); Sheaf Steamship Company, Newcastle (1949–52); William Cory & Son Ltd, London (1952–64); M. Scufalos, Greece (1964–65)
- Port of registry: (United Kingdom) Grangemouth (1942-49); (United Kingdom) Newcastle upon Tyne (1949-64); Greece (1964-65)
- Builder: Grangemouth Dockyard Company
- Yard number: 444
- Launched: 10 October 1942
- Completed: December 1942
- Identification: Code Letters BFGJ (1942–64); United Kingdom Official Number 169097 (1942–64)
- Fate: Wrecked on 13 February 1965

General characteristics
- Class & type: Collier
- Tonnage: 2,065 GRT
- Length: 272 ft 0 in (82.91 m)
- Beam: 40 ft 0 in (12.19 m)
- Depth: 17 ft 2 in (5.23 m)
- Propulsion: 1 × triple expansion steam engine (North Eastern Marine); 204 hp (750 ihp)
- Speed: 9.5 knots (17.6 km/h)

SS Empire Clansman was a 2,065 ton collier which was built in 1942 for the Ministry of War Transport (MoWT). She saw service mainly in British coastal waters during the Second World War, before running aground and being badly damaged in 1945. She was subsequently salvaged and returned to service for several companies after the war, under the names Sheaf Field, Corfield and then Spyros Amrenakis, before being wrecked for a second and final time in 1965.

== Description ==
The ship was built by Grangemouth Dockyard Co, Grangemouth. She was launched on 10 October 1942 and completed in December that year.

The ship was 272 feet 0 inches (82.91 m) long, with a beam of 40 feet 0 inches (12.19 m) and a depth of 17 feet 2 inches (5.23 m). She had a GRT of 2,065 and a NRT of 1,75.

The ship was propelled by a triple expansion steam engine, which had cylinders of 17 inches (43 cm), 27 inches (69 cm) and 48 inches (120 cm) diameter by 36 inches (91 cm) stroke. The engine was built by the North East Marine Engine Co Ltd, Newcastle upon Tyne.

== History ==
Empire Clansman was built by Grangemouth Dockyard Company, Grangemouth as yard number 444. She was launched on 10 October 1942 and completed in December 1942. Empire Clansman was built for the Ministry of War Transport and managed by Stephenson Clarke & Associated Companies Ltd. Her port of registry was Grangemouth. The United Kingdom Official Number 169097 and Code Letters BFGJ were allocated.

=== Wartime career ===
Empire Clansman served in a number of convoys during the war, spent mostly sailing between British ports, particularly Methil and Southend, but also on occasion visiting the ports of Milford Haven and Portsmouth. She was also at Loch Ewe in December 1943, an assembly point for merchants and naval escorts assigned to the Arctic convoys. She was to sail with her final convoy from Methil on 18 January 1945 as part of convoy EN 470, bound for Belfast with a cargo of coal. She was initially detained at Methil, and so missed the sailing of the convoy, but it was decided that she should sail anyway and attempt to overtake it. She duly sailed at 4 p.m, but by 9.30 p.m. that evening and with the weather worsening, the master of the Empire Clansman, Philip Smith Williams, made the decision to turn his ship around and seek shelter. As he did so, he ran his ship onto Bass Rock. One of the sailors aboard the Empire Clansman, Able Seaman F. Southern, was subsequently drowned. A report carried out by the Board of Trade in 1947 declared that 'The stranding was caused by an error of judgement on the part of the master' and criticised his decision to 'return to shelter from a position in the open sea involving running towards a lee shore in the existing weather conditions.' The Empire Clansman had been badly damaged, but was salvaged and rebuilt.

=== Postwar ===
Empire Clansman returned to service in 1948, sailing for the Sheaf Steamship Company, Newcastle-upon-Tyne as the Sheaf Field. She was sold to William Cory & Son, of London in 1952 and renamed the Corfield. She was sold for the final time in 1964 to M. Scufalos, Greece and entered service with them under the name Spyros Armenakis. She served for less than a year, before being wrecked on the Nolleplaat sandbank, off Vlissingen, Netherlands on 13 February 1965. All 21 crew were rescued by lifeboat. Spyros Armenakis was carrying a cargo of coal from the United Kingdom destined for Terneuzen, Netherlands.
