= Klansmen: Guardians of Liberty =

Book by Alma Bridwell White

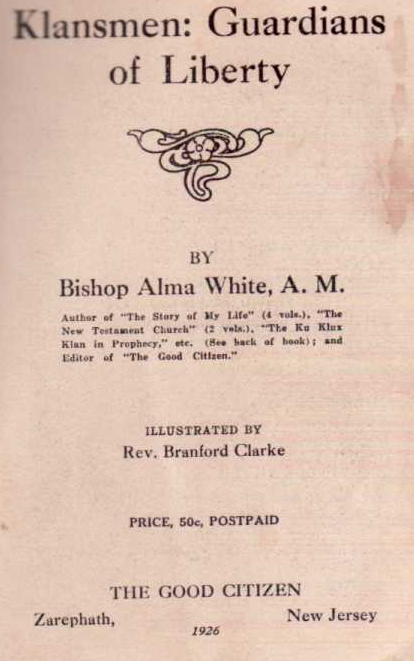
- Author: Alma Bridwell White
- Illustrator: Branford Clarke
- Subject: Anti-Catholicism, antisemitism, nativism and white supremacy
- Publisher: Pillar of Fire Church
- Publication date: 1926
- Pages: 174
- Preceded by: The Ku Klux Klan in Prophecy (1925)
- Followed by: Heroes of the Fiery Cross (1928)

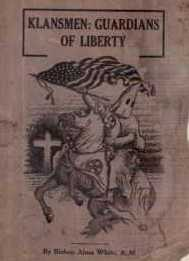
Alternative cover

Klansmen: Guardians of Liberty was a book published by the Pillar of Fire Church in 1926 by Bishop Alma Bridwell White and illustrated by Branford Clarke. She claims that the Founding Fathers of the United States were members of the Ku Klux Klan, and that Paul Revere made his legendary ride in Klan hood and robes. She said: "Jews are everywhere a separate and distinct people, living apart from the great Gentile masses ... they are not home builders or tillers of the soil." Her book, which contains many anti-Catholic themes, became popular during the United States presidential election of 1928 when Al Smith was the first Catholic presidential candidate from a major party.

== History ==
White authored over 35 books and founded the Pillar of Fire Church, where she made herself a bishop.

This book is almost entirely an anti-Catholic polemic. At one point it says that the KKK is "the friend of the negro" since it wants to keep all bloodlines equally pure, but it also promotes antisemitism, racism, white supremacy and women's equality. Guardians is a compendium of essays and sermons by White and illustrations by Clarke that were originally published in her pro-KKK political periodical The Good Citizen, one of the numerous periodicals published by her Pillar of Fire Church at their communal headquarters in Zarephath, New Jersey.

The book contains an introduction by Arthur H. Bell, the Grand Dragon of the New Jersey Ku Klux Klan. It is the second of three books White published to promote the KKK. The other two books were 1926's The Ku Klux Klan in Prophecy, and 1928's Heroes of the Fiery Cross. White republished her Klan books as a three volume set in 1943, three years before her death and 21 years after her initial association with the Klan, under the title Guardians of Liberty.

The contents included essays entitled The Hebrew Rock, Klansmen of the Revolution, Rome's Idolatrous Shrines and Papal Prisons in America.
