= King of the World =

King of the World may refer to:

== Books ==
- King of the World (biography), 1998 biography of boxer Muhammad Ali, by David Remnick
- King of the World, a 1989 novel by Merrill Joan Gerber
- The King of the World, a 1927 book by René Guénon

== Film and television ==
- King of the World (film), a 2000 television film about Mohammed Ali
- King of the World: The King Kong Show, a 1966 television special of The King Kong Show

== Music ==
=== Albums ===
- King of the World (album), a 1980 album by Sheila and B. Devotion, and its title track
- King of the World, a 1970 album by Cuby + Blizzards
- King of the World, a 2007 album by Ward 21

=== Songs ===
- "King of the World" (Natalie Grant song), 2016
- "King of the World" (Point of Grace song), 2008
- "King of the World" (Weezer song), 2016
- "King of the World", a 1973 song by Steely Dan from Countdown to Ecstasy
- "King of the World", a 1994 song by Angelfish from Angelfish
- "King of the World", a 1995 song by Jason Robert Brown from the musical Songs for a New World
- "King of the World", a 1995 song by Blackhawk from Strong Enough
- "King of the World", a 1998 song by Jeff Black from Birmingham Road
- "King of the World", a 1999 song by The Smithereens from God Save The Smithereens
- "King of the World", a 2001 song by Bob Schneider from Lonelyland
- "King of the World", a 2006 song by Toto from Falling in Between
- "King of the World", a 2009 song by Livan
- "King of the World", a 2009 song by Porcelain Black
- "King of the World", a 2012 song by Show of Hands from Wake the Union
- "King of the World", a 2015 song by Blue from Colours
- "King of the World", a 2015 song by Natalie Grant from Be One
- "King of the World", a 2019 song by Natasha Bedingfield from Roll with Me
- "King of the World", a 2023 song by Hotel Mira

== Other ==
- King of the Universe, an ancient Mesopotamian title
- Shah Jahan (lit. 'King of the World'), Mughal emperor of India from 1628 to 1658
- King of the World (sculpture), in Washington, D.C., United States
- "I'm the king of the world!" – a line from the 1997 film Titanic

== See also ==
- World domination
