= Religious views of Muhammad Ali =

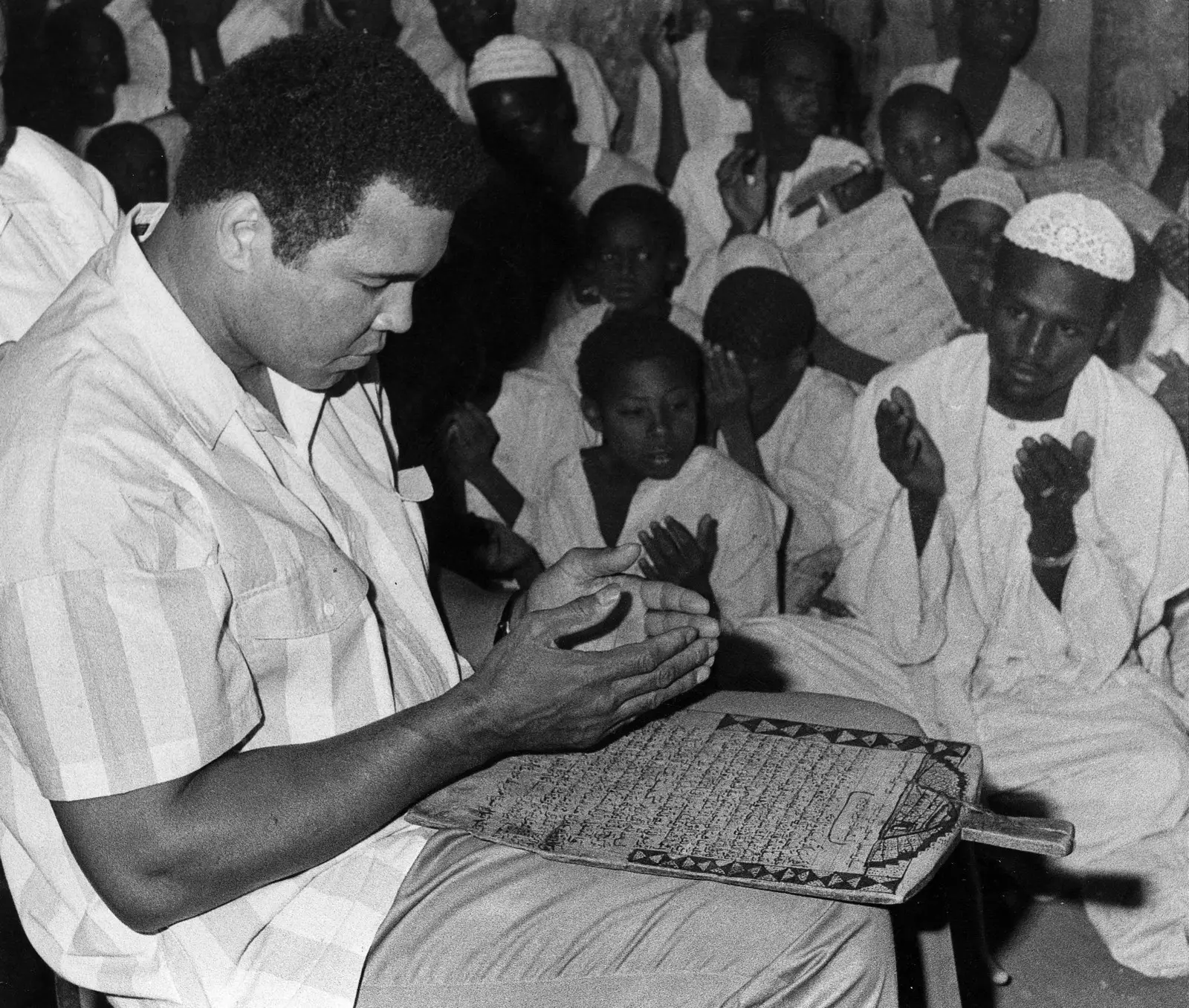
Muhammad Ali in Sudan, 1988

Muhammad Ali was initially raised as a Baptist before his high-profile conversion to Islam. In the early 1960s, he began attending Nation of Islam Meetings. There, he met Malcolm X, who encouraged his involvement and became a highly influential mentor to Ali. Ali, who was named Cassius Clay after his father, first changed his name briefly to Cassius X and then finally to Muhammad Ali in 1964.

In later years, Ali moved away from the Nation of Islam and its racially separatist ideas to embrace "true Islam." In 2005, he adopted Sufi Islam. He was particularly influenced by Sunni-Sufi beliefs, which he continued to hold until his death in 2016.

== Ali and Nation of Islam ==
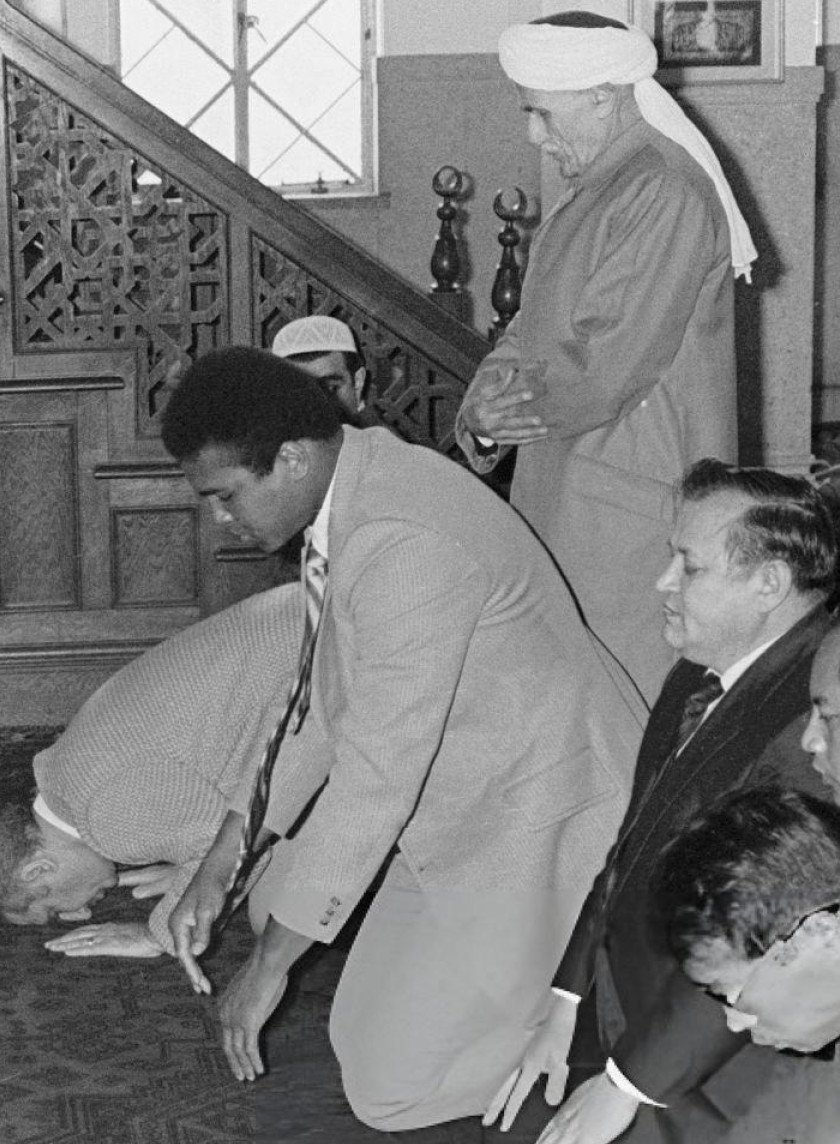
Ali praying in 1972

Muhammad Ali said that he first heard of the Nation of Islam when he was fighting in the Golden Gloves tournament in Chicago in 1959, and attended his first Nation of Islam meeting in 1961. He continued to attend meetings, although keeping his involvement hidden from the public. In 1962, Ali met Malcolm X, who soon became his spiritual and political mentor.

Ali first met Malcolm X, Elijah Muhammad's chief disciple at the time in Nevada in 1962. Malcolm X is credited with playing a critical role in the evolution of Ali's religious views by steering him towards the Nation of Islam. Ali would subsequently go on to attend the rallies and lectures of Malcolm X and Elijah Muhammad. By the time of the first Ali-Liston bout, Nation of Islam members, including Malcolm X, were visible in his entourage. This led to a story in The Miami Herald just before the fight disclosing that Ali had joined the Nation of Islam, which nearly caused the bout to be canceled. The article quoted Cassius Clay Sr. as saying that his son had joined the Black Muslims when he was 18.

After his win in the first Ali-Liston bout, Ali was publicly welcomed into the organization by Elijah Muhammad, and named "Cassius X", which was his "waiting name", and eventually "Muhammad Ali." (Note: Ali's biographer Remnick noted that it was unusual for Elijah to have given a "completed" Islamic name to Ali; most members of the Nation used X as their last name. Elijah Muhammad typically gave "completed" Islamic holy names only to longstanding members of the Nation, who had been with the organization for decades, as a mark of honor.)

In an interview with George Plimpton, given shortly before his rematch with Liston, Ali expounded on the ontological teachings of Elijah Muhammad and Elijah's instructor Wallace Fard Muhammad. According to these teachings, which Ali said he believed in, there exists a space platform operated by "men who never smile" which orbits the Earth at the speed of 18,000 miles per hour. The platform contains bombs which would be dropped at Armageddon which would begin after a threshold in the earth's collective guilt had been breached. (Note: In his interview with Plimpton, Ali stated that Wallace Fard had prophesied that the holocaust would arrive in 1970, leveling everything, and leaving only 154,000 black survivors to "get things going again." Ali claimed he did not know if he would be among the survivors.) Ali claimed he had seen the platform on several occasions. A member of Ali's entourage, Cody Jones, who was also present during this interview, corroborated what Ali said and claimed he had seen the platform together with Ali at five A.M. one morning when the two were out jogging. Jones described the platform as "a bright light darting in the sky." According to Plimpton the "bright light darting in the sky", seen by Ali and Jones, was probably either Venus or Jupiter.

On being probed further by Plimpton, Ali explained that according to this belief system the first inhabitants of the Earth were blacks. Among them was an "evil genius", Yakub, the "devil" of this religion. After six hundred years of working in a laboratory, Yakub created the white race. Yakub was eventually ejected from paradise, together with 59,999 of his inventions, (Note: Almost all figures in this mythology are exact, notes Plimpton.) who went on to eventually subjugate the blacks.

In interviews for his 1991 biography Muhammad Ali: His Life and Times, and his 1998 biography King of the World, Ali clarified that he no longer believed in the existence of the space platform or in Yakub anymore. According to Ali, "hearts and souls have no color", and it was wrong of Elijah Muhammad to have talked of "white devils". Ali's biographer David Remnick noted that everything "threatening or obscure" about the Nation of Islam's teachings, including the space platform, Yakub, and racial separatism, had long been forgotten by Ali.

== Ali and Sunni Islam ==
After Elijah Muhammad's death, in 1975, his son Wallace D. Muhammad (later Warith Deen Mohammed) assumed leadership of the organization, following which the fundamental doctrines of the Nation of Islam underwent a change to bring them closer to Sunni Islam. The divinity of Elijah, and that of the Nation of Islam's founder Wallace Fard Muhammad, was denied by Wallace D., and a nonracial view of religion was promulgated in which white people were no longer considered "devils". Eventually, a schism emerged amongst the followers of Elijah, between a faction loyal to Wallace, and another loyal to Louis Farrakhan. Farrakhan continued advocating the "racial separatism" of Elijah Muhammad, and reportedly considered Wallace "a soft minded heretic." (Note: Wallace would go on to change the name of the Nation of Islam to, initially the World Community of al-Islam in the West, and later to the American Muslim Mission. Subsequently, he encouraged all mosques affiliated with his organization to "be independent under the leadership of the Muslim American Society, or the Ministry of W. Deen Mohammed." Farrakhan, who revived the teachings of Elijah Muhammad, under the old Nation of Islam name, later reportedly moved his own splinter organization closer to mainstream Islam, according to a March 2000 article in The Baltimore Sun. According to an article in OnFaith, Farrakhan and Wallace publicly reconciled and made a declaration of unity in the year 2000.)

Ali decided to follow the teachings of Wallace Muhammad. In an interview for his 1991 biography Muhammad Ali: His Life and Times, Ali commented:

[Wallace] learnt from his studies that his father wasn't teaching true Islam, and Wallace taught us the true meaning of the Quran. He showed that color don't matter. He taught that we're responsible for our own lives and it's no good to blame our problems on other people. And that sounded right to me so I followed Wallace, but not everyone in the Nation felt that way. Some of the ministers didn't like what he was teaching. Jeremiah Shabazz didn't like it. Louis Farrakhan didn't like it either. They believed Elijah was a prophet, and they've kept the exact ways Elijah taught them. But I've changed what I believe, and what I believe in now is true Islam.

=== Ali and Sufism ===
In his 2004 autobiography, The Soul of a Butterfly, Ali revealed that he had developed an interest in Sufism. Around 2005, Ali adopted Sufi Islam, and announced that out of all Islamic spiritual schools of thought, he felt most strongly inclined towards Sufism.

According to Ali's daughter, Hana Yasmeen Ali, who co-authored The Soul of a Butterfly with him, Ali was attracted to Sufism after reading the books of Inayat Khan which contain Sufi teachings. According to Ali's biographer and friend Davis Miller:

Sufis believe that to purposely harm any person is to harm all of humanity, to harm each of us and to damage the world. It is the perfect fit for Ali, who had been living in the ways that Sufis do for decades before he'd heard of the religion. Few people have heard about the profound ways Ali's faith has evolved over the years. He has been a world soul for many decades; he has grown from separatist to universalist.

Ali later moved away from Inayat Khan's teachings of Universal Sufism, towards traditional Sunni-Sufi Islam. Muhammad Ali received guidance from Sunni-Sufi Islamic scholars such as Grand Mufti of Syria Almarhum Asy-Syaikh Ahmed Kuftaro, Shaykh Hisham Kabbani, Imam Zaid Shakir, Shaykh Hamza Yusuf, and Dr. Timothy J. Gianotti, who was at Ali's bedside during his last days and ensured that his funeral was in accordance with Islamic rites and rituals.

== Ali's religious views and boxing ==
From a boxing perspective, it is speculated that Malcolm X may have contributed to enhancing the probability of Ali winning his first bout with Liston, by instilling into Ali the belief that he was invincible, and that it was destined that he would win. At the weigh-in before the first Ali-Liston fight, Ali had shouted: "It is prophesied that I should win! I cannot be beaten!" According to Dennis and Atyeo:

Malcolm X firmly implanted in Ali's mind the belief that he was invincible which must have been of enormous psychological advantage to a young fighter facing the awesome Sonny Liston. Ali became a fanatic and fanaticism greatly increased his resolve. By the time he learned that he was not invincible, Ali had matured enough to take the lesson in his stride. Conversely, the thought of having to face a dreaded "Black Muslim" must have been at the very least a slightly daunting proposition for many of Ali's opponents, especially the ones he christened "Uncle Toms."
