= Church of Saint Simeon Stylites =

Historical church in Syria

- كنيسة مار سمعان العمودي قلعة سمعان
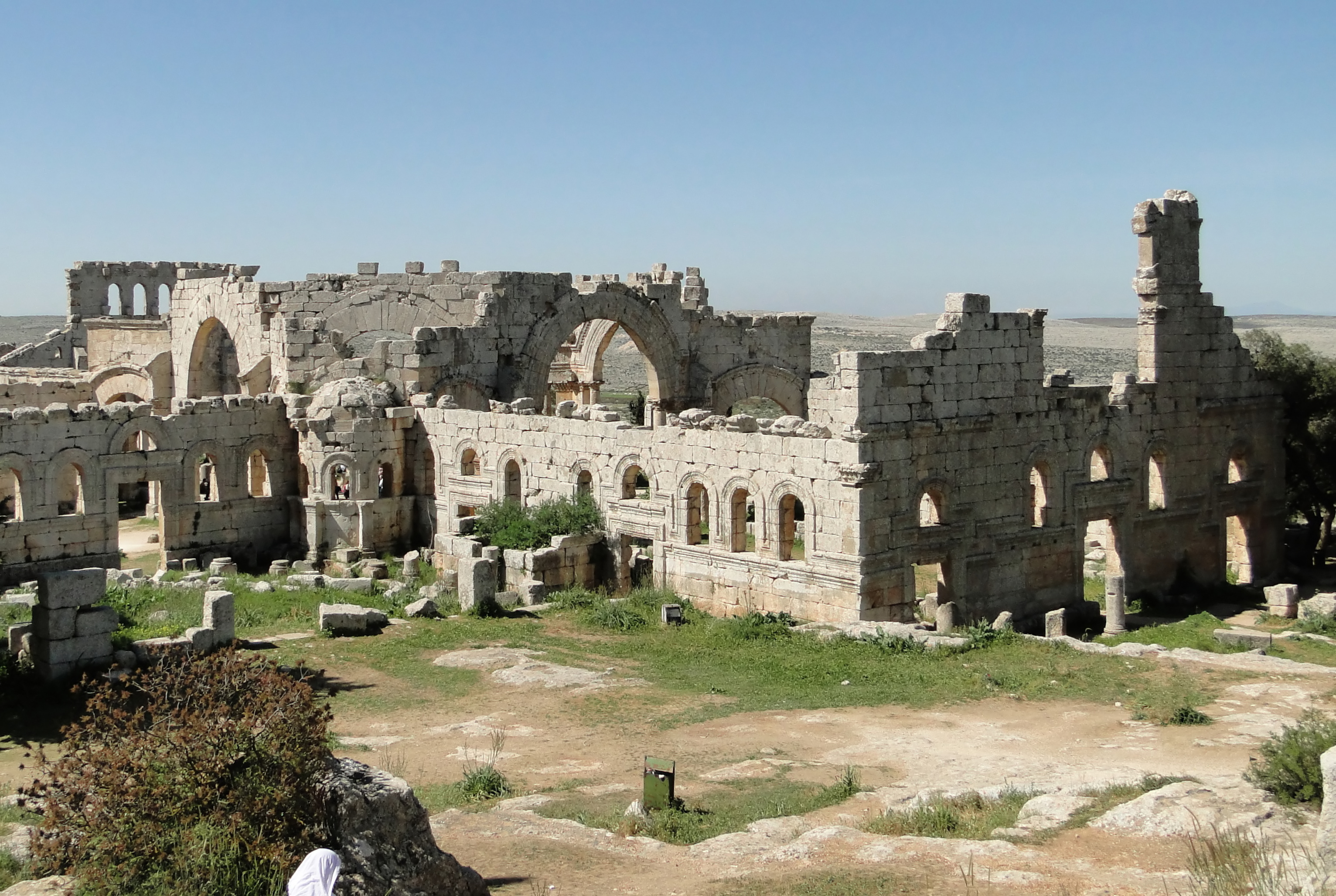
- Overview of the complex

Religion
- Affiliation: Christian
- Year consecrated: 475 AD
- Status: in ruins

Location
- Location: Mount Simeon, Aleppo Governorate, Syria
- Interactive map of Church of Saint Simeon Stylites
- Coordinates: 36°20′03″N 36°50′38″E

Architecture
- Type: Church
- Style: Byzantine architecture

The Church of Saint Simeon Stylites (Arabic: كنيسة مار سمعان العمودي, romanized: Kanīsat Mār Simʿān el-ʿAmūdī) is one of the oldest surviving church complexes, founded in the 5th century. It is located approximately 30 kilometres (19 mi) northwestern of Aleppo, Syria. It was constructed on the site of the pillar of Saint Simeon Stylites, a renowned stylite monk. The church is popularly known as either Qalaat Semaan (قلعة سمعان, Qalʿat Simʿān, the "Fortress of Simeon") or Deir Semaan (دير سمعان, Dayr Simʿān, the "Monastery of Simeon"). Completed in 490, it was not surpassed as a Christian church until the construction of Hagia Sophia was finished in 537.

In the year 638 the monastery fell into the hands of the Miaphysites, and it was destroyed by Arab tribes in the year 985.

In 2016, during the Syrian civil war, Russian airstrikes damaged parts of the complex and the remains of St. Simeon's column. In 2023, an earthquake caused severe structural damage to the already fragile ruins. The complex finally reopened to visitors after restoration works on October 2nd, 2026.

== History ==
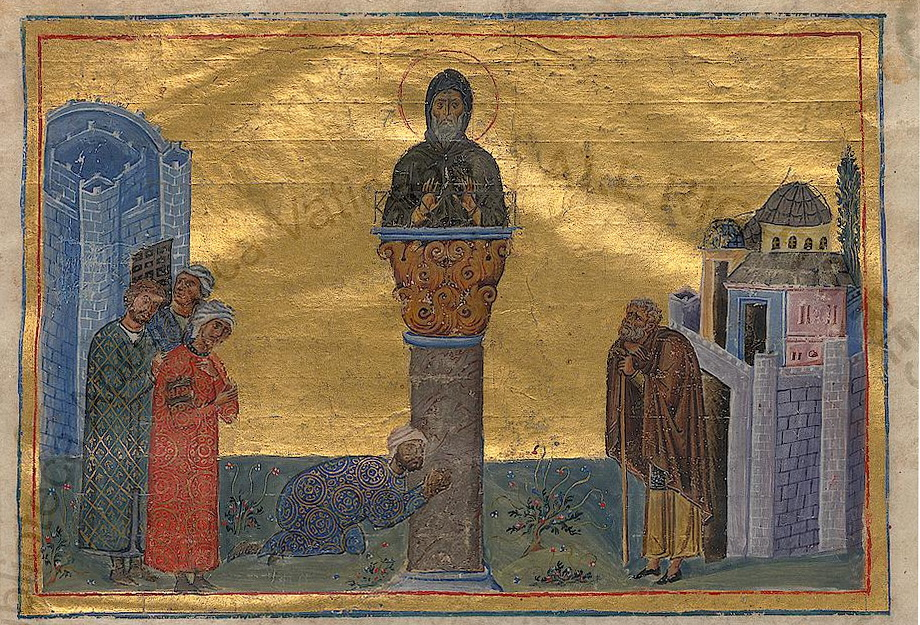
Symeon the Stylite, illustrated in the 11th century Menologion of Basil II.

Saint Simeon was born in 390 AD in the Amanus mountains village. He entered a monastery at the age of 16, but he was judged to be unsuited for cenobitic life due to his extravagant asceticism. Following the example of Saint Anthony, he attempted to live the life of a hermit ascetic in the wilderness, but his feats of physical endurance and self-denial attracted pilgrims seeking religious instruction and other devout admirers. In an effort to escape from such distractions, he resolved to live on a small platform atop a 3-meter column. The height of the column was raised over time to 18 meters. From his perch, Simeon preached twice a day to the crowds who gathered to witness this spectacle of self-mortification. A ladder attached to the column allowed messengers to bring food and written messages to Simeon, who also sent letters to his followers this way. He became well-known enough to attract the attention of the eastern emperors Theodosius, Leo, and Theodosius II, who sought his advice and implored his intervention in state affairs. Simeon lived on the column for years, dying in AD 459 at the approximate age of 69. After a fierce contest for the possession of his remains between Antioch and Constantinople, it was settled in favor of Antioch. His remains were transported to Antioch, accompanied by a procession of the patriarch of Constantinople, 6 bishops, the Master-General of the East, 21 counts and tribunes and 6,000 soldiers. His tomb became a major pilgrimage destination.

A few decades following Saint Simeon's death, a large monastic church occupying over 5,000 square meters was constructed on the site where his pillar stood. The church was made up of four basilicas that emanated from the sides of a central octagon. The octagonal crossing was surmounted by a dome; at its center stood Simeon's column. The church was the centerpiece of a walled monastic complex that included two minor churches, and pilgrim hostels. In the year 638 the monastery fell into the hands of the Miaphysites.

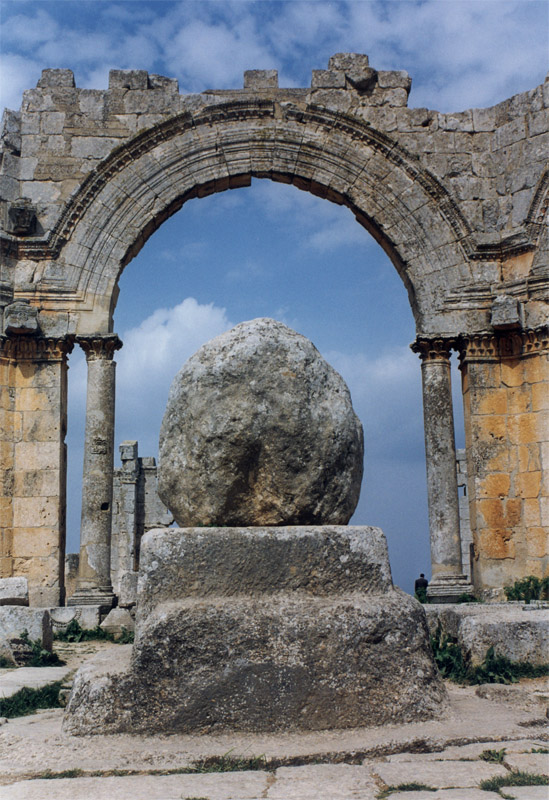
The remains of the pillar of Saint Simeon Stylites in 2000, before 2016 Russian airstrikes.

Long abandoned and ruined, the site is part of the series of ruins referred as the Dead Cities of Syria. Until just recently, remains of the pillar of Saint Simeon still stood, despite having been whittled down to a block only a few meters tall from years of pilgrims cutting down small parts for themselves as relics; substantial surviving parts of the column shaft were last visible in the 17th century. The dome above it apparently survived until the 19th century.

=== Arab-Byzantine Wars ===
The church was negatively affected by the Arab conquests during the struggle for control of Syria between the Byzantines and the Arabs. Afterwards, the Byzantines fortified the church. In 986, the complex was attacked by the Hamdanid commander Qarghuya, under Sa'd al-Dawla. Qarghuya sacked the church, slaughtered its monks, and enslaved refugees who had fled there, sending them to Aleppo as a spectacle.

=== Syrian Civil War ===
The Syrian civil war has caused a lot of damage to the historical site in the violence between the opposing parties in the conflict. Additionally, the building has been destroyed through illegal digging and stone removal. It is one of the many ancient buildings on the Northern side of Syria which have been degraded by the conflict. The structure has been under threat from both the Syrian and Turkish governments through their conflict over the Bab al-Hawa Border Crossing. On 28 May 2015, the church was captured by the Kurdish YPG/YPJ but was subsequently lost to factions opposing the Assad government. In May 2016, the Russian Air Force attacked the church, damaging the remains of the pillar of St Simeon as well as the rest of the ruins. By 8 February 2020, the hilltop near the site was occupied by the Turkish Land Forces.

In February 2023, an earthquake caused more structural damage. The western narthex entrance arch and its columns collapsed.

Following restoration and safety works, the complex reopened to visitors on 28 September 2026. The work, carried out by Aleppo Governorate, antiquities authorities and other organizations and volunteers, included cleaning and landscaping, repairs to visitor routes and facilities, rehabilitation of the main square, and reinforcement of vulnerable structures. St. Simeon's column was also returned to its location.

== Architecture ==
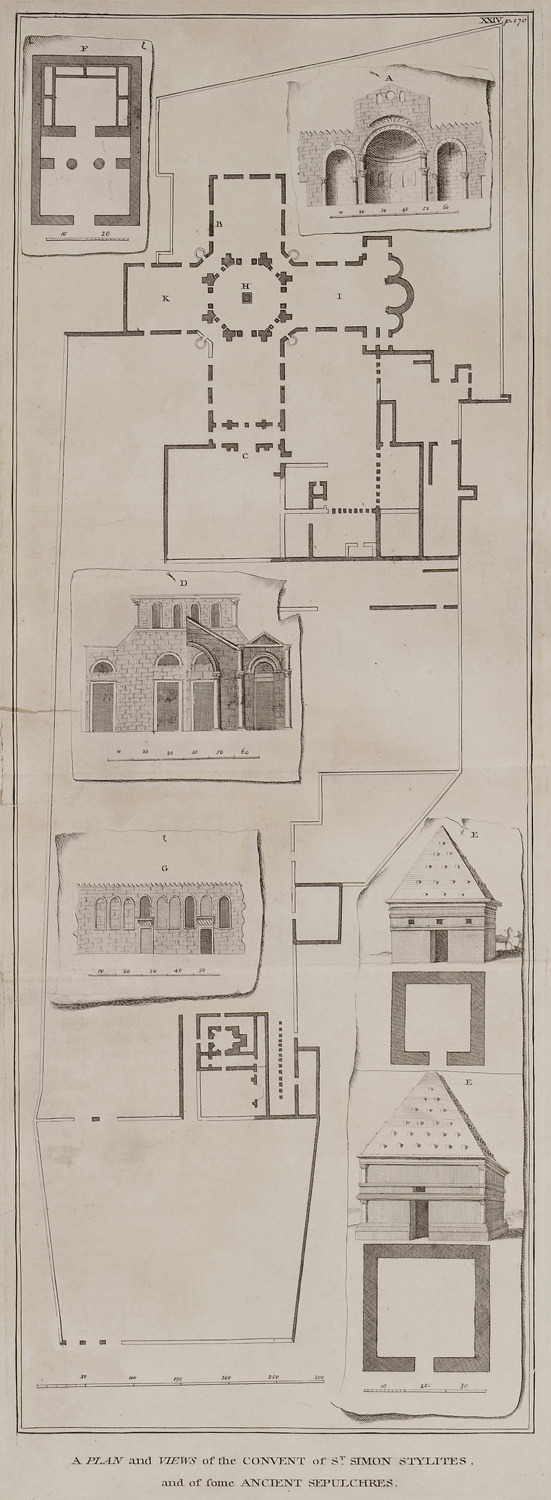
A Plan and Views of the Convent of St Simon Stylites, and of some Ancient Sepulchres, Richard Pococke, 1745

As opposed to many of the cathedrals that were constructed in medieval Europe, the idea of the church of Saint Simeon was born and realized as one project over a short span of time. It was designed in a cruciform made up of four distinct basilica complexes. The high number of pilgrims who frequently flocked to the column of Saint Simeon to pray necessitated the construction of the church in 473 AD.

The ambitious plan of the church of Saint Simeon complex portrays numerous architectural designs. The fundamental concept of the three-aisled basilica can be traced to the lasting traditions of the Romans. It is reported that the main basilica and the baptistery were the first to be constructed. Subsequently, the monastery and the fixtures to the baptistery followed. Ultimately, the other parts of the complex including the colossal arch on the Via Sacra were built last in the construction process. A notable part of the church of Saint Simeon is the massive arch that is located at the beginning of the Via Sacra on the way to the cathedral on the mountain. In addition, two monasteries are visible from the church; a bazaar which is a few little housings, and a tomb chapel. The following are the numerous grouped buildings that were arranged at the complex.

=== The four-basilica church ===
The cross shaped church was finely preserved. Inside, the pillar of Saint Simeon is still visible, but it has been reduced to approximately 2 meters high and now resembles a boulder in the middle of the courtyard. The reduction in the length of the pillar can be attributed to many years of relic-gathering by pilgrims. The courtyard is octagonal and is bordered by four basilicas in the shape of a rood-tree and described as a four-basilica church. The idea of a crucifix was to represent the crucifixion of Jesus on the cross. The east basilica is considerably bigger than other basilicas. The more significant size can be attributed to the critical role it played in hosting key ceremonies, making it most important.

=== The U-shaped monastery ===
Bordering the south partition of the eastern basilica laid a chapel and a monastery. Originally, Deir Semaan (Simeon Monastery) bore the name of Telanissos and was established to make the most of the two productive plains that surrounded it. In the mid of the 5th century AD, the locals established a monastery on the plains and in 412 AD, Saint Simeon opted to be part of it. Later on, he left the locals to live there as he went to live in the mountain above the plains where the monastery was situated.

=== Baptistery ===
The baptistery was located on the opposite side of the southern basilica, down the sacred road known as Via Sacra. The baptistery was constructed shortly after the construction of the main church, and it served as a crucial part of the pilgrimage complex. The design of the baptistery was often regarded to be amongst the remarkable artifacts of the Christian architecture in the entire Syria. The baptistery was constructed in two phases; the baptistery itself first and related little basilicas later. The baptistery took the form of an octagonal drum that lay on the top of the square base of the building. At some point, it was filled with a wooden roof, with shape either like a cone or dome. The inner octagon was covered in a rectangular outer building. At the far end of the chamber to the east lays a semi-circular apsidiole that encompasses a tunnel with steps heading down to its location.

=== Extensions to the Baptistery ===
The processional route guides towards the Deir Semaan (Simeon Monastery) emanates from the western side of the baptistery. At the opening of this road is the monumental arch, which runs from the monastery in the direction of the baptistery. The location of the church on the hill provides views of the surrounding countryside.

== UNESCO ==
As of June 2011, the Church and surrounding village were designated by United Nations Educational, Scientific and Cultural Organization (UNESCO) as part of the "Ancient Villages of Northern Syria", a World Heritage Site.

== Gallery ==
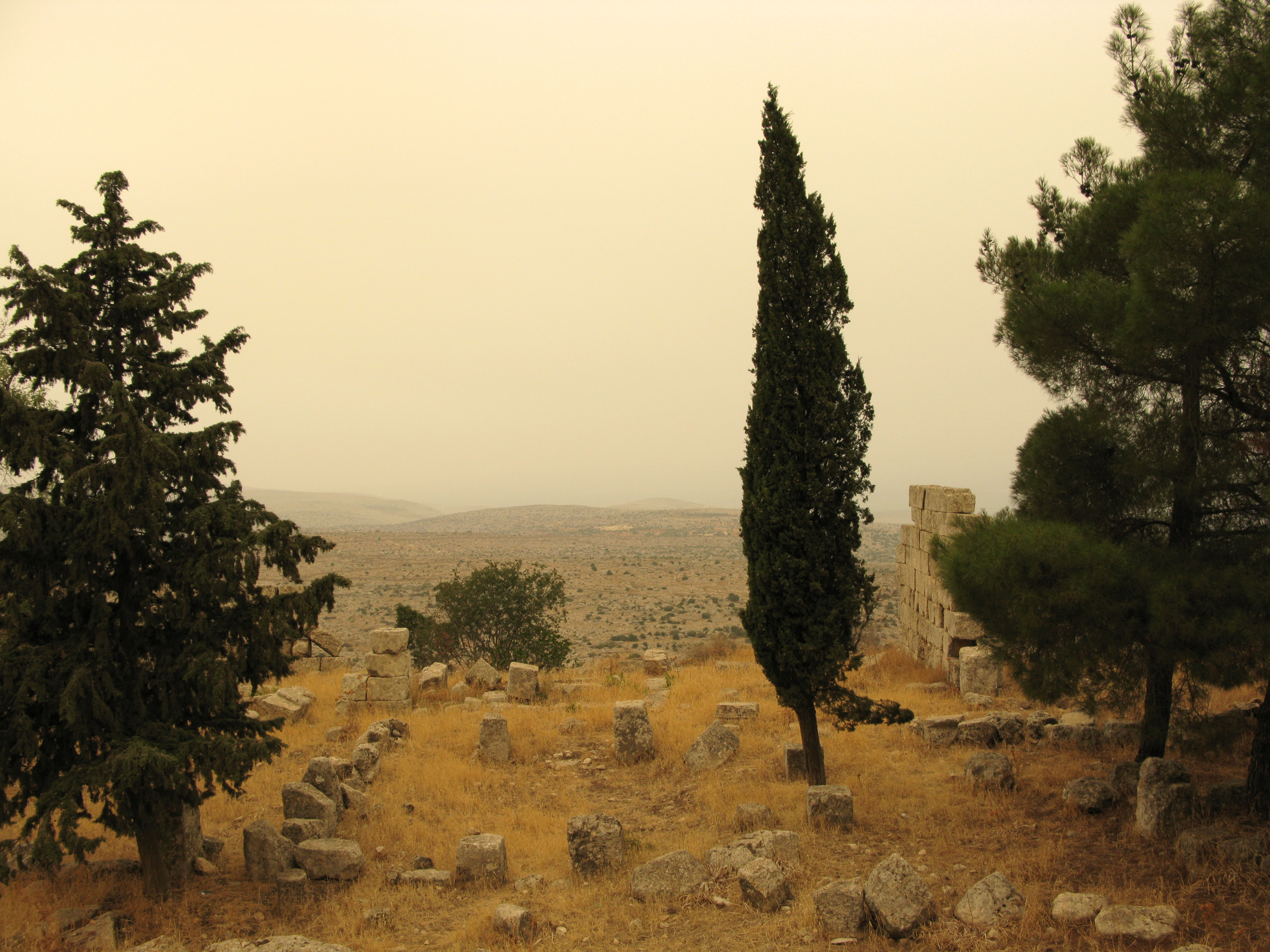
View of the surroundings

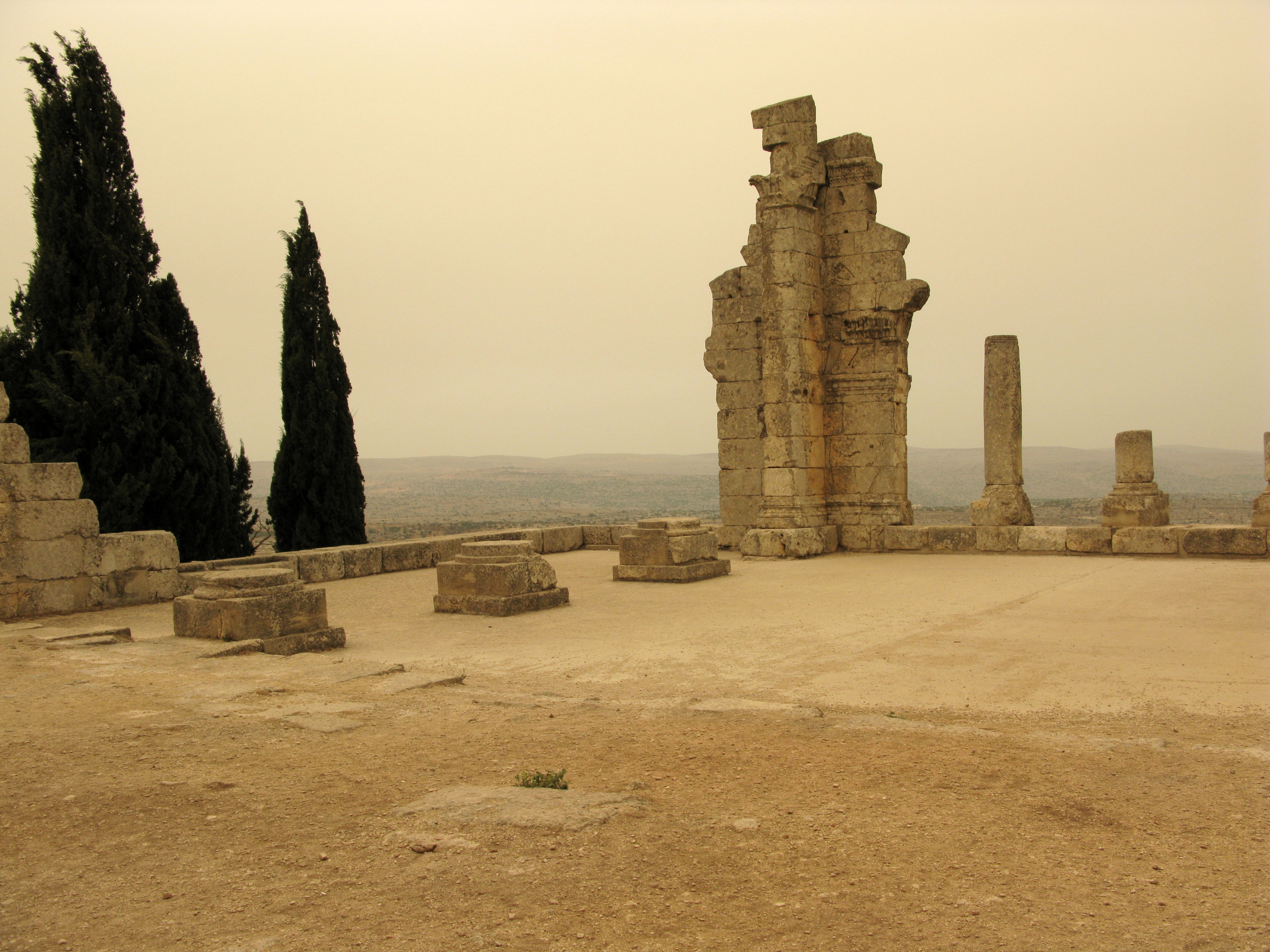
Court

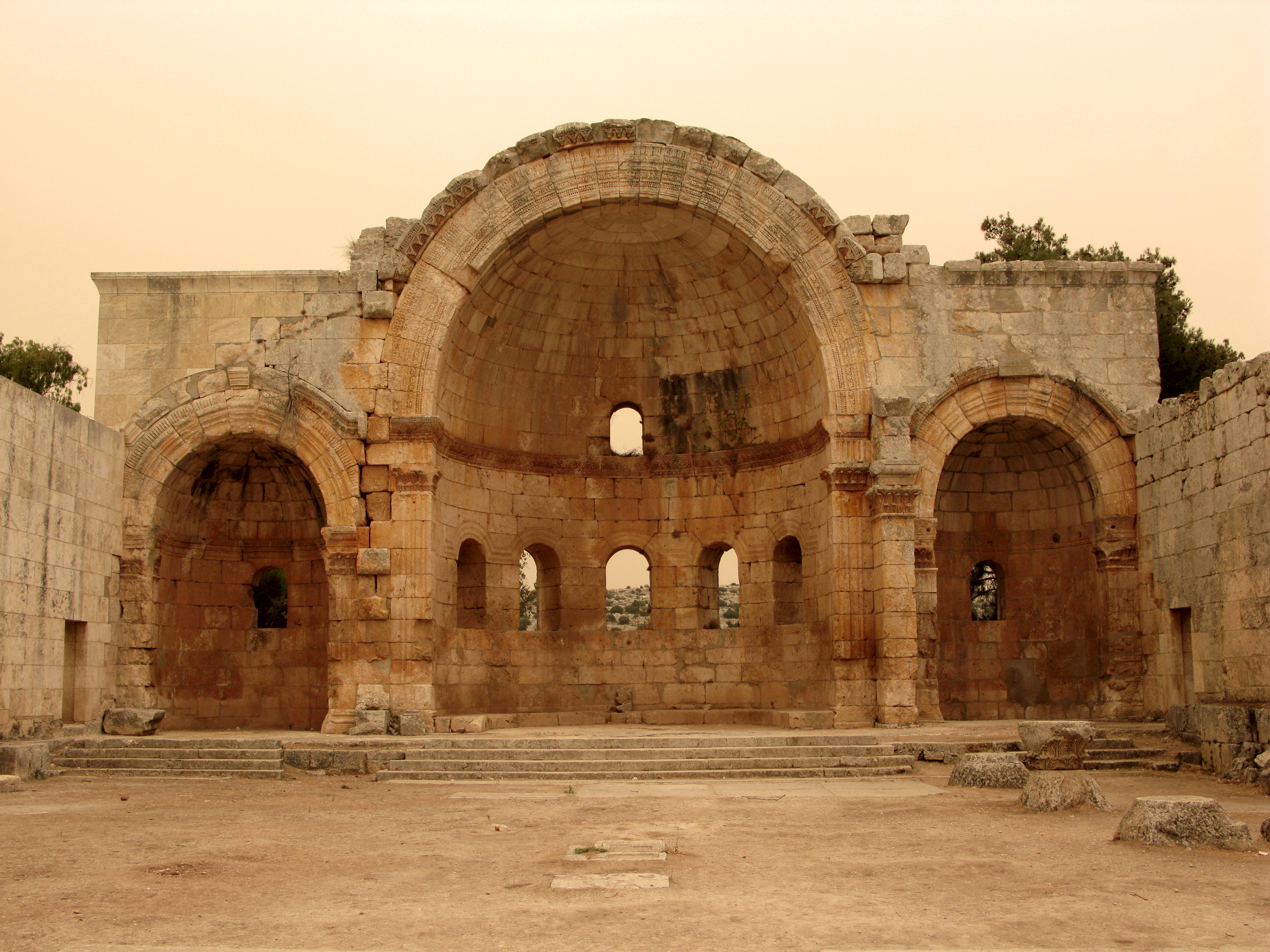
Interior

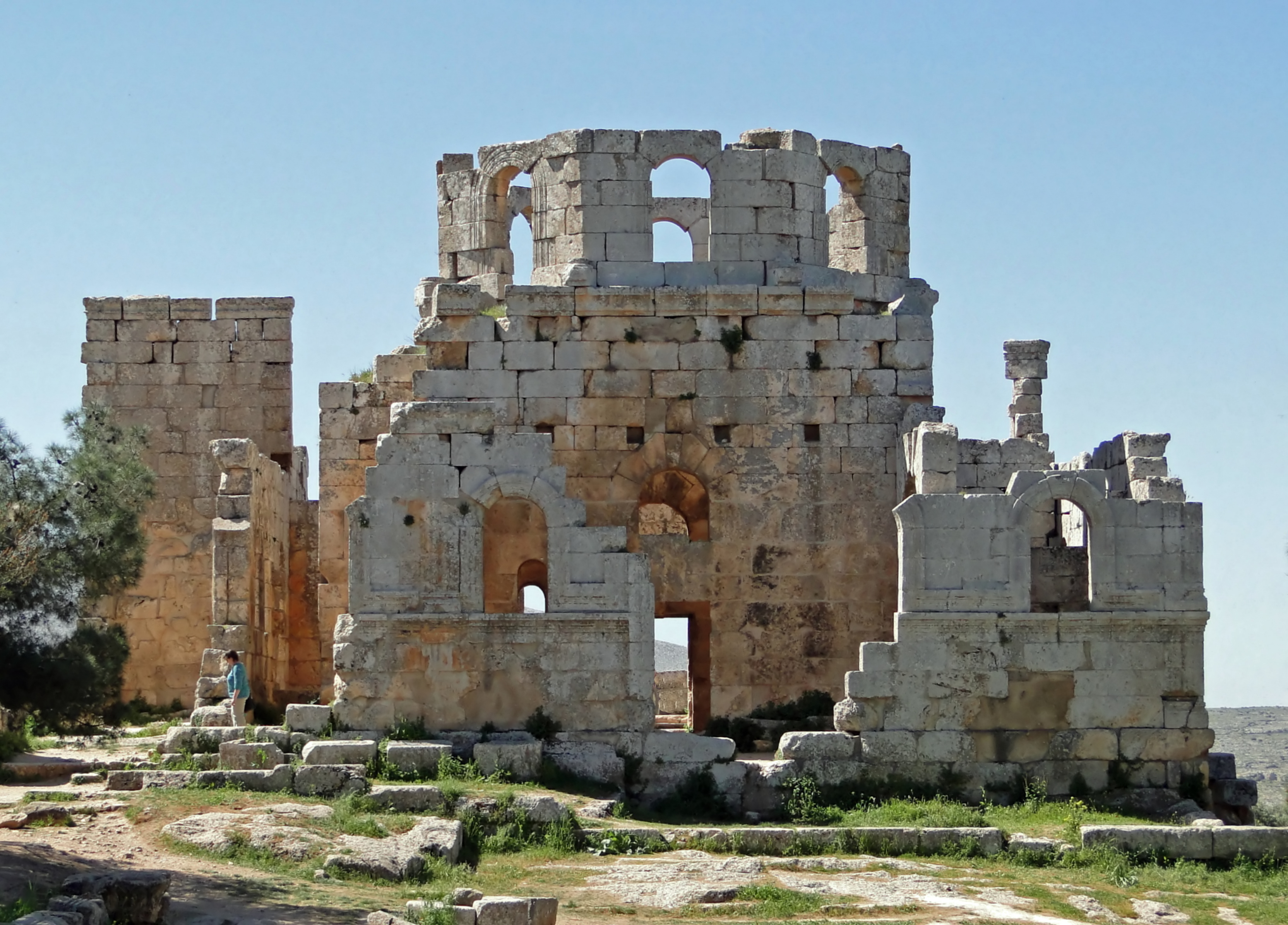
The Baptistry

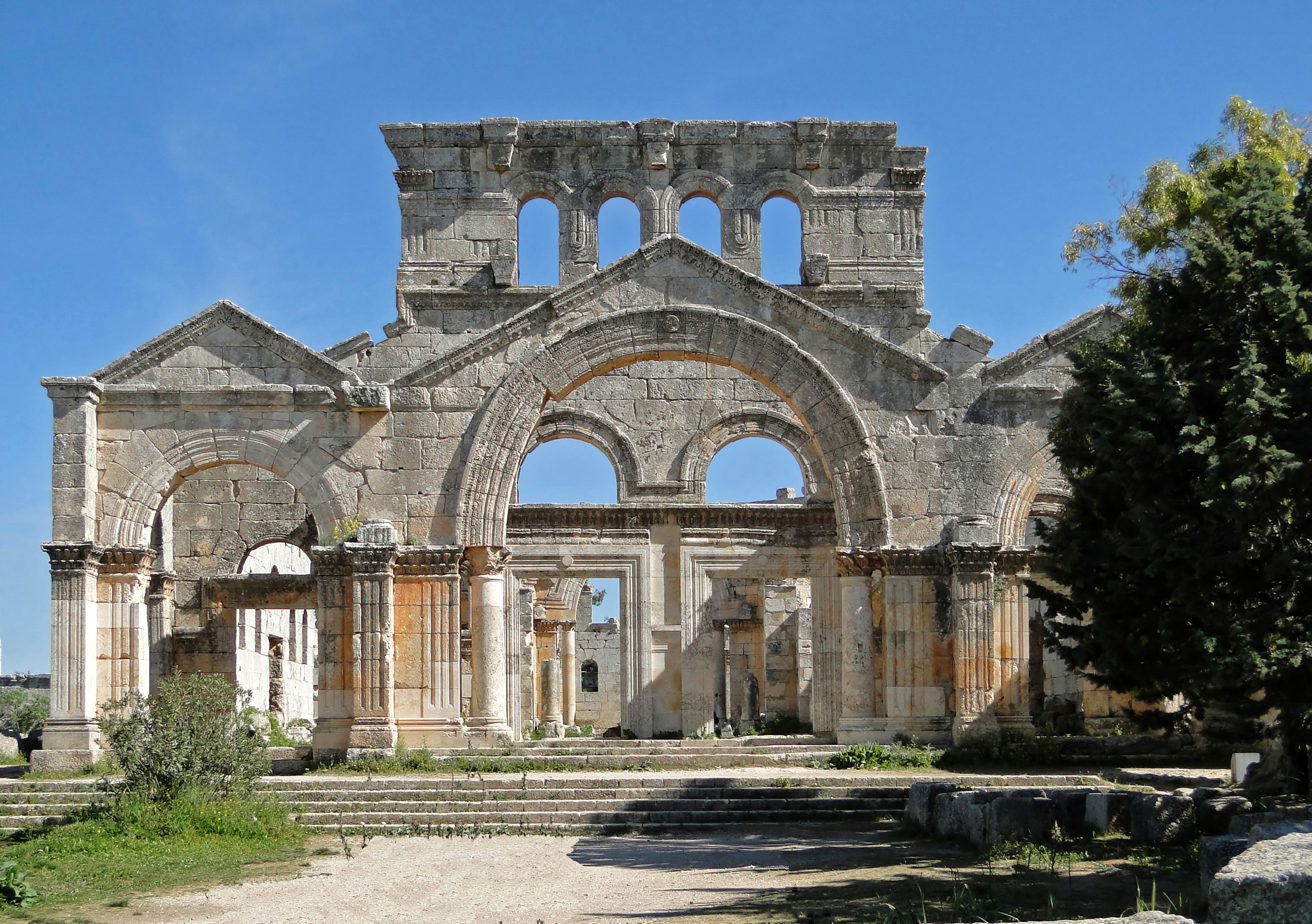
South facade of Church of Saint Simeon

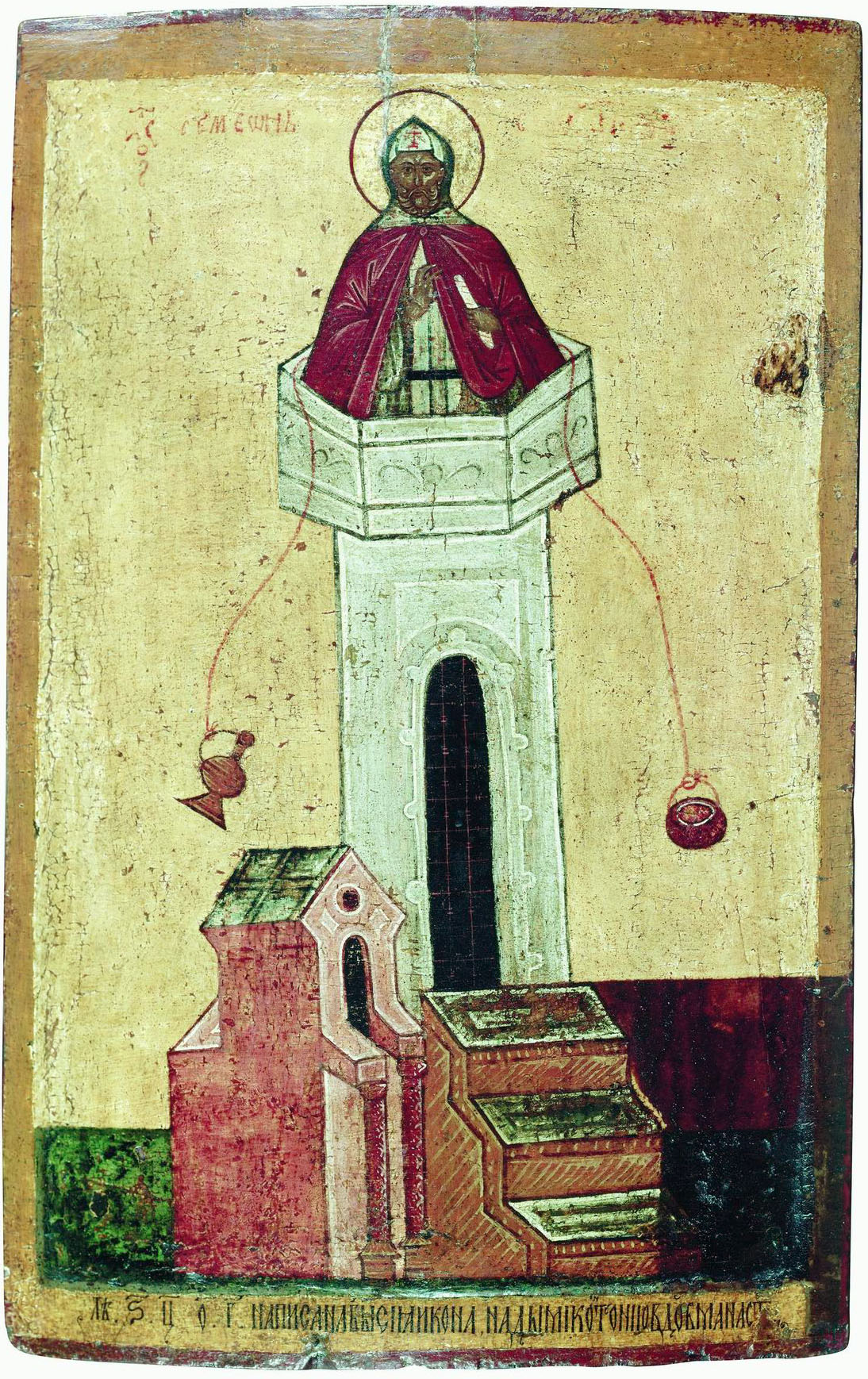
Icon of Saint Simeon

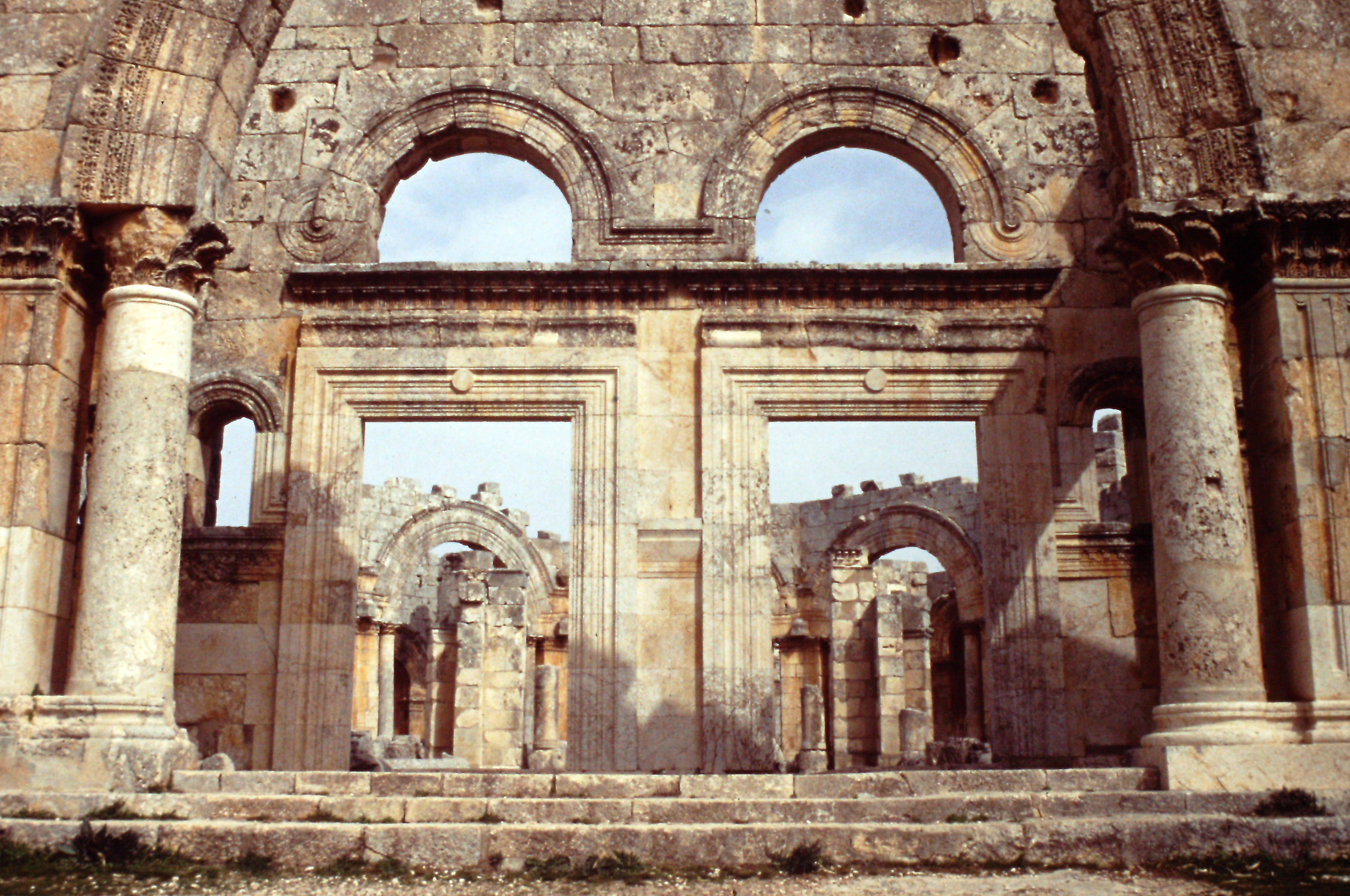
Facade of Church of Saint Simeon

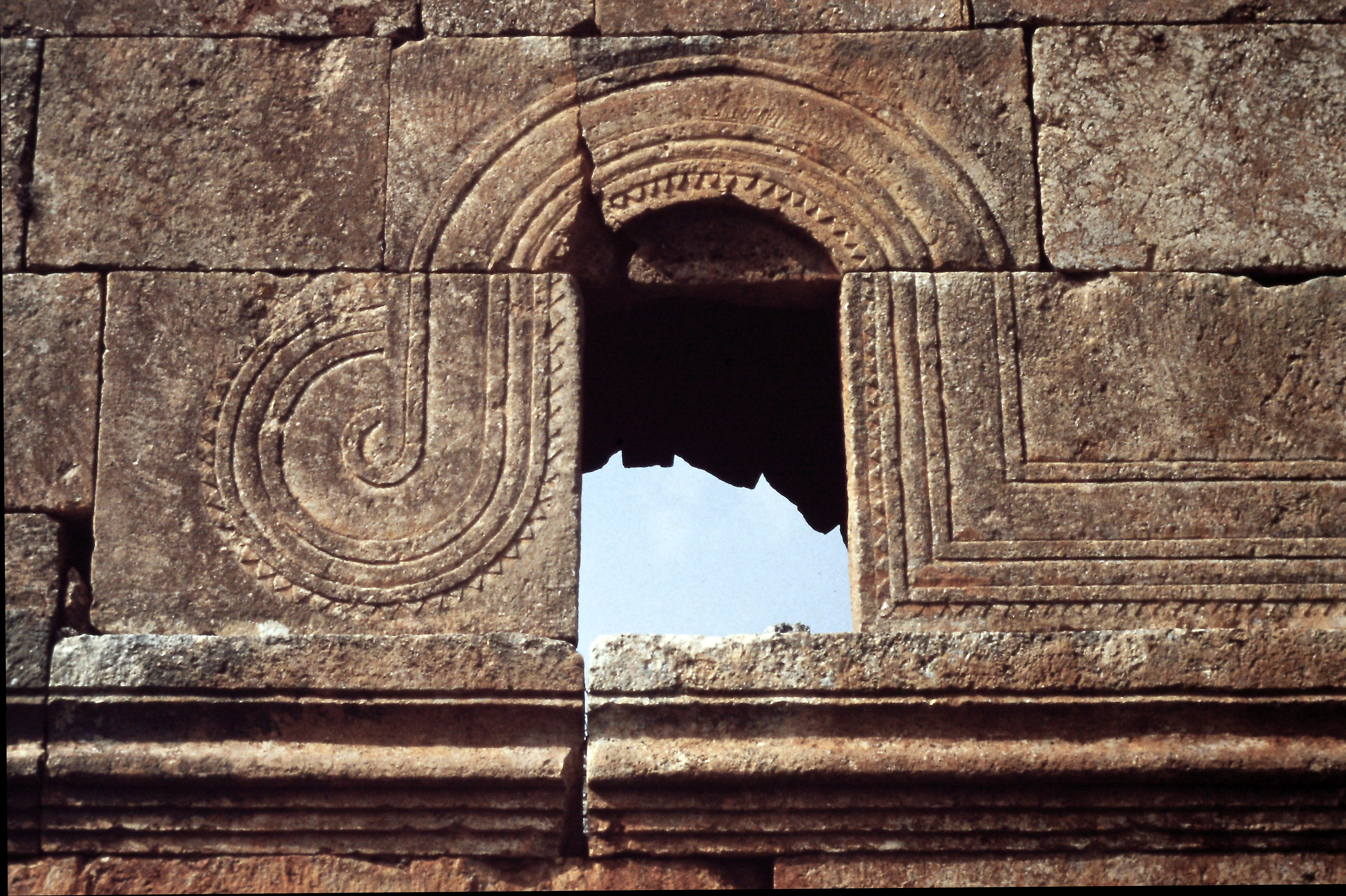
Pattern in the walls of the Church

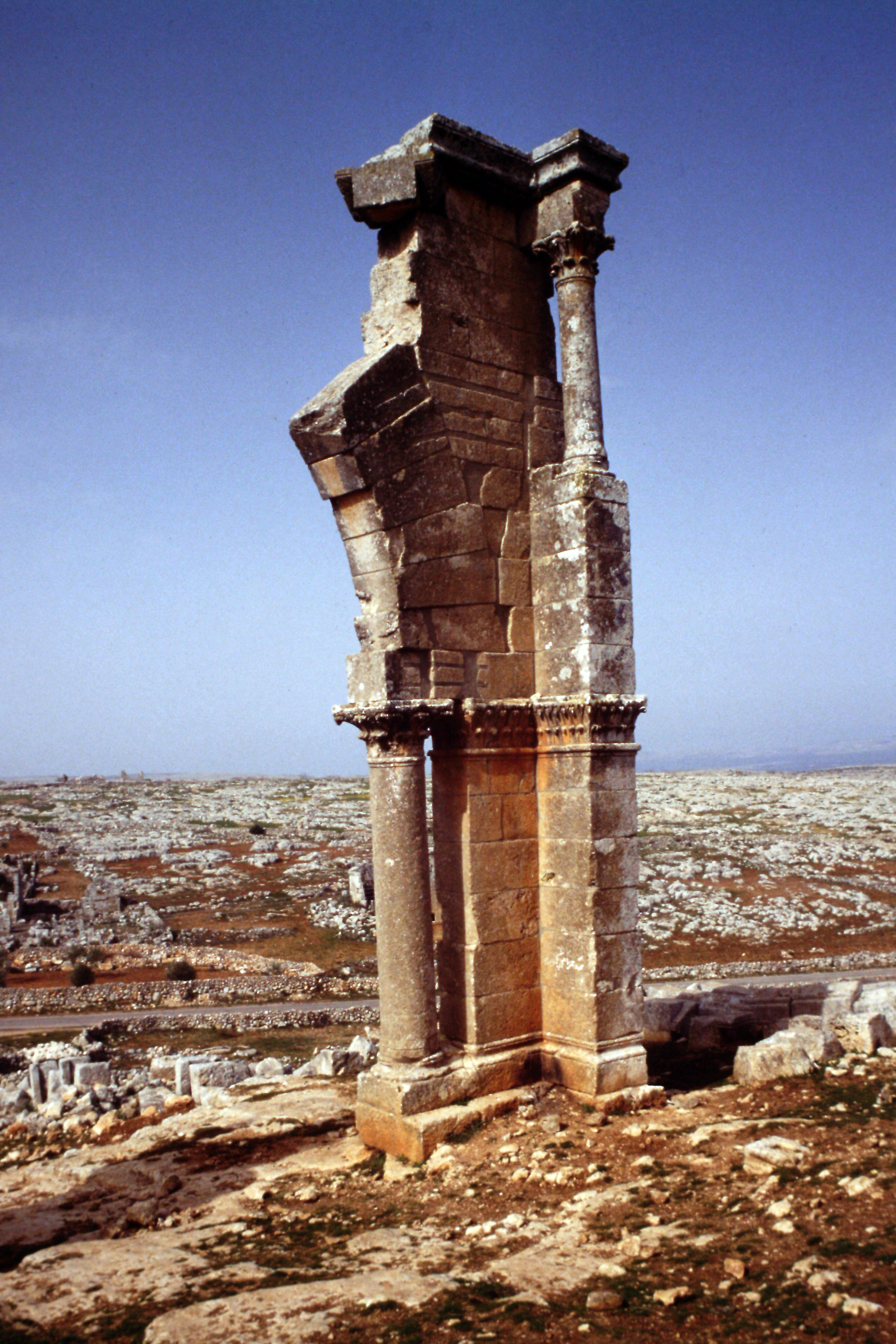
Remains of the atrium

== See also ==
- Oldest churches in the world
- Ancient Roman and Byzantine domes
- 350 Maronite Martyrs
- Umar II

== Sources ==
- Gary Vikan, Byzantine Pilgrimage Art, (Dumbarton Oaks Papers, 1982), 8–9.
- Forsyth, John Harper (1977). The Byzantine-Arab Chronicle (938-1034) of Yahya b. Sa'id al-Antaki (PhD thesis). University of Michigan.
- Simeon Citadel and Dead Cities, Suggestion to have Saint Simeon Stylites recognized as a UNESCO world heritage site, in 2006, as part of "Simeon Citadel and Dead Cities" project.
- "St. Simeon Church." Syria Gate (accessed 2008).
- Sacred Destinations
- https://whc.unesco.org/en/list/1348/multiple=1&unique_number=1761
