= King of the World (film) =

- Also known as: Muhammad Ali: King of the World
- Genre: Biography; Drama; Sport
- Based on: King of the World by David Remnick
- Teleplay by: John Sacret Young
- Directed by: John Sacret Young
- Starring: Terrence Howard; Steve Harris; Chi McBride; Gary Dourdan; John Ventimiglia; Jamie "Showtime" Stafford
- Music by: John Frizzell
- Country of origin: United States
- Original language: English

Production
- Producers: Stephanie Germain; Tom Patricia; George W. Perkins; John Sacret Young
- Running time: 120 minutes

Original release
- Network: ABC
- Release: January 10, 2000

King of the World is an American television film which aired on January 10, 2000, on ABC. It chronicles the early stages of the career of heavyweight boxer Muhammad Ali (then known as Cassius Clay), who is portrayed by Terrence Howard. It is based upon a biography of the same name by David Remnick.

== Plot summary ==
Having won the gold medal for boxing in the light heavyweight division at the 1960 Summer Olympics in Rome, Kentucky native Cassius Clay (Terrence Howard) challenges professional heavyweight boxing champion Sonny Liston (Steve Harris) for the title. The media is both intrigued and repulsed by his brash manner and what appears to be self-worship. Despite being a heavy underdog, the 22-year-old Clay shocks the sports world by defeating Liston by technical knockout in their February 1964 bout, becoming heavyweight champion and (metaphorically) "king of the world".

== Cast and characters ==
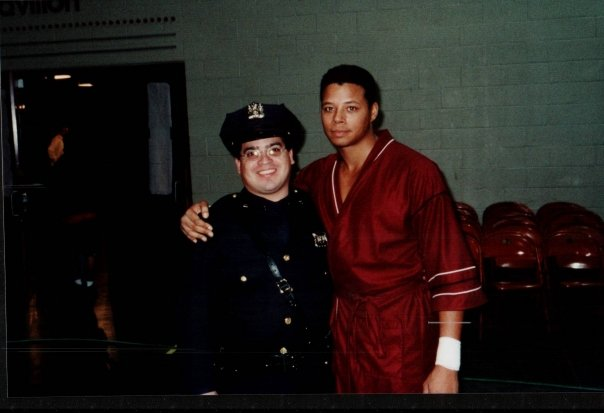
Sam Olivares with Terrence Howard.

- Terrence Howard as Cassius Clay
  - Jamie "Showtime" Stafford as Young Cassius Clay
- Steve Harris as Sonny Liston
- Chi McBride as Drew Bundini Brown
- Gary Dourdan as Malcolm X
- John Ventimiglia as Angelo Dundee

== Home video ==
King of the World was released on Region 2 DVD in Europe.

== See also ==
- Ali: An American Hero - another 2000 biopic about Ali, airing on Fox.
