= Rex Mundi =

Rex Mundi is Latin for King of the World.

Rex Mundi may also refer to:

- Rex Mundi (comics), an American comic book series
- Rex Mundi (Malibu Comics), a fictional character in Malibu Comics' Ultraverse imprint
- Rex Mundi High School, a former Catholic high school in Evansville, Indiana, USA
- Rex Mundi, a DJ signed to Armada Music
- The evil God in Cathar cosmology

== See also ==
- King of the World (disambiguation)
