= Ulster Project =

Ulster Project logo

The Ulster Project was started in 1975 by Stephen Kent Jacobson of the US Episcopal Church and Kerry Waterstone, a Church of Ireland priest in Tullamore, County Offaly, Republic of Ireland, in order to provide a safe place in the United States for teenagers from Northern Ireland to discuss the climate of "The Troubles" that were facing them at home. Its original success in Connecticut led rapidly to other member cities across the United States.

== History ==
The Ulster Project had its origin in the imagination of Stephen K. Jacobson. He became rector of St. Mary's Episcopal Church in Manchester, Connecticut in 1974 and soon discovered that 30% of the local community traced their ancestry to the town of Portadown in Northern Ireland. They came to Manchester to work in the Cheney Silk Mills as weavers. St. Mary's parish had been organized by immigrants from St. Mark's Parish in Portadown. Jacobson had been active in the American civil rights movement and was appalled by what was happening in Ulster. In 1974, he asked himself if the people of Manchester might make some small contribution for the cause of peace and reconciliation between Catholics and Protestants; in Ulster and in Manchester.

A year earlier he had become acquainted with A.T. Waterstone, rector of St. Catherine's in Tullamore, Republic of Ireland. Jacobson had advertised in The Church of Ireland Gazette inviting clergy to exchange pulpits with him in Middlebury, Connecticut. As a result, Waterstone spent two months in America and Jacobson spent two months in Ireland. Jacobson reached out to monsignor Edward Reardon. St. James Roman Catholic Church was located directly across the street from St. Mary's and cordial relationships existed between the two. Reardon expressed interest and planning began for what they called "The Irish Children's Project." A total of $25,000 was raised by the two churches. Jacobson asked Waterstone to introduce him to clergy in Portadown, Belfast and Armagh. When Jacobson visited Northern Ireland and proposed the project to archbishop Simms in Armagh and cardinal Conway in Belfast he received enthusiastic support. The first young people were selected by their local clergy. They were youngsters who showed promise of becoming leaders in their communities in the future. At the successful completion of the 1975 project, Jacobson was approached by Mr. and Mrs. Charles Robinson of Wilmington, Delaware. As trustees of the Raskob Foundation they proposed to take the program to a national level. They did so by financing Pacem in Terris, an ecumenical agency in Wilmington, DE. Today this effort in Manchester has become the International Ulster Project.

Currently, the project brings teens from eleven cities/districts in Northern Ireland, including Banbridge, Belfast, Derry, Omagh, Coleraine, Strabane, Sion Mills, Limavady, Portadown, Castlederg, Enniskillen and Cookstown. The teens from Northern Ireland will live with their host families for the month of July, becoming an extra son or daughter of the family with whom they are staying. The Northern Irish teens are selected for this experience based on recommendations from their clergy and teachers, often completing an application and interview. The host teens and families in the U.S. are selected in much the same manner, with an application process and home interview to ensure the willingness of the family to participate and to also prepare them for the hectic schedule that will be followed during the actual project.

Once selected for the project, the Northern Irish teens begin meeting in January and continue to do so until the project starts in July, with the intention of developing close ties.

In the United States, there were as many as 29 cities and 17 states hosting the Northern Irish teenagers, including Youngstown, OH, Milwaukee, WI, New Orleans, LA, Lafayette, LA, Lake Charles, LA, Arlington, TX, Atlanta, GA, Salt Lake City, UT, Alliance, OH, Cincinnati, OH, Massillon, OH, Canton, OH, Tucson, AZ, Delaware, North Shore, IL, DuPage County, IL, Madison, IN, Decorah, IA, Hutchinson, KS, McPherson, KS, Greenville, NC, Pennsylvania, Chattanooga, TN, Kingsport, TN, Knoxville, TN, Memphis, TN, Nashville, TN, Manchester, MD and Oak Ridge, TN. Each of these cities/states hosts a variable number of teens, from eight to eighteen, based on their ability to secure the appropriate number of host families and raise the amount of funds necessary to host the project. In 2006, 256 Irish teens visited the United States and participated in the project.

In 2009 only 19 cities are still involved in actively bringing teens to the United States. The other cities have stopped bringing teens across and some have disbanded altogether. False perceptions of peace, hampered by a faltering world economy have led many projects to either decrease the number of teens that they sponsor for the trip, or stop hosting Northern Irish teens altogether. This results in many young people applying and very few actually receiving a place on the project.

== How it works ==
The Ulster Project is based on a simple idea of sharing experiences. Catholic and Protestant teenagers are hosted by American families of the same religion and with a teenager of the same age and gender. In this manner, friendships are created immediately to provide a safe and trusting atmosphere. The teens meet daily in structured activities designed to foster trust between the different cultures represented in the project.

The various projects across the U.S. have different specific methods they use to teach the peace-building tools to the Northern Irish, but central to all projects is a program called "Discovery", "Time of Discovery" or "Adventure Sharing". This weekly meeting involves discussions of the troubles facing the teens in their homes, schools and churches, and helps to teach new ways around the prejudices and stereotypes that contribute to the violence often found in Northern Ireland. A Discovery team of counselors, teachers and other facilitators organizes the activities and ensures participation from all the teens, both American and Irish, in order to teach the message of prejudice-reduction.

These sessions are confidential, giving the teens the opportunity to speak honestly with their peers and approach what are often painful subjects for the teens, e.g., the Twelfth, the "marching season", the Orange Order and the IRA.

== Influence on popular culture ==
Simon Kerr's novel The Rainbow Singer is the story of an Ulster Project participant, who (unbeknownst to his parents or the Ulster Project staff) is also an Ulster Protestant terrorist. The protagonist fights with two Catholic boys from Ulster early in the process of preparing the youths for the trip to America, must cope with unrequited love for an Ulster Catholic girl in his group, as well as the (unsuspected to the 'host' family) psychopathy of his "foster brother" in Wisconsin. Author Kerr has the protagonist's violent background, the violent nature of the American teenager with whom he shares a bedroom, teenage romantic angst, and homophobic reactions all lead to a mass shooting, leaving the protagonist and the Catholic girl who left him torn between love and hate among the few survivors. The memoir is told from the protagonist's cell in an American prison where he's been sent to serve a lifetime sentence for his part in the shooting, and is a narrative of the author's theories about crime, love, hate, and the tyranny of families set within the Ulster Project process.
