= 350 Maronite Martyrs =

Maronite monks massacred in 517

Saints 350 Maronite Martyrs
- Died: 517; Near the Church of Saint Simeon Stylites, Mount Simeon, Byzantine Syria
- Venerated in: Catholic Church
- Feast: 31 July

The 350 Maronite Martyrs were a group of Maronite monks who were killed by Monophysite Christians, in 517, for maintaining belief in the Chalcedonian doctrine. They are venerated as the first martyrs of the Maronite Church and are commemorated on 31 July.

== History ==
In the year 451 A.D. the Council of Chalcedon was convoked by Byzantine emperor Marcian. The council resulted in the Chalcedonian Definition regarding the nature of Christ which professed Dyophysitism. While the Maronites accepted the council, other groups would reject the council such as the Miaphysites, who would go on to become the Oriental Orthodox Churches, and the Monophysites.

The monastery of Beth-Maron near Apamea would go on to become the main center of Maronite and Chalcedonian doctrine, much to the dismay of the Monophysites living nearby. In 517, Maronite monks who were on their way to the Church of Saint Simeon Stylites were ambushed and attacked at Kaprokerameon (modern day Kafr Karmīn, Syria) by a Monophysite army sent by the Non-Chalcedonian Byzantine emperor Anastasius. Even the monks who took refuge at altars were slain and many monasteries were burnt with havoc ensuing throughout the night.

== Letters ==
Following the massacre, the monks of Beth-Maron wrote a letter to Pope Hormisdas which mentioned the martyrs stating:

Therefore also certain ones of those, who in no way endure the blows brought upon them have gone over because of this and our not so small number of people has in fact almost completely vanished. For when we were going to the pen of the Lord Simeon for the cause of the Church, they were lying in wait for us on the way as it had been announced, defiling us, and when they came upon us by surprise, they killed three hundred and fifty men from among us, certain ones they wounded; but others, who could take refuge to the venerable altars, they slayed there and set the monasteries on fire, inciting throughout the night a multitude of unsettled people and contractors and they were wasting all the poverty of the Church through destructive trouble makers of this kind. About the details, however, the writings may instruct your blessedness, which were brought over by the venerable brothers, John and Sergius, whom we had sent to Constantinople, because we believed that revenge might take place for those things which had been committed. Yet he did not think them worth a word, but rather he expelled them with great mistreatment and he violently threatened those, who would present these (things). Therefore it is from here that we, perhaps (too) late, know that all the depravity and recklessness of such evil people, which is committed against the churches, is arranged through his incitation.

We pray, therefore, most blessed one, we go on our knees and ask, that you stand up with fervor and zeal and rightly have pity for the body that is torn to pieces (for you are the head of all) and that you avenge the faith that has been despised, the canons that have been trodden under foot, the fathers who have been blasphemed and such a great synod that has been attacked with anathema.

Hormisdas responded on 10 February 518 stating:

I have read your highly esteemed letters, by which the insanity of the enemies of God has been laid open and the obstinate fury of the unbelievers, who with revived spirit hate the Lord and thereby wickedly persecute his members, has painfully been exposed: To the extent that it pertains to the recognition of your perseverance, I praise God that he preserves the faith of his soldiers in the midst of adversities. Yet again with regard to the shaking of the churches and the troubles and toils of the servants of God, I meditated upon my sighs with the help of the prophet and cried out: "Arise, O Lord; judge your cause; think of the acts of injustice against your people, of these things which all day long are done by the fool!" [Ps 73.22 (LXX)] Freely, also, I am adding the words which follow: "Do not forget the voice of the ones who seek you; the arrogance of those, who hate you, always rises up to you." [Ps 73.23 (LXX)] For we guard the steadfastness of the faith, as it is right, (and) so it is not proper to despair of the justice of God's judgment. This toil of the Church, brothers, is nothing new, yet nevertheless, while she is humiliated, she is set up straight and through these crimes, by which they believe they can weaken her, she is enriched. It is of advantage for the faithful of God, that through the deaths of their bodies they should gain the lives of their souls: they lose, indeed, what is vain, but they acquire what is eternal, and, while persecution prepares the way for testing, testing becomes the cause of merit...One must not join the ones who have fallen with the ones who are falling: May they perish without infecting us, those who do not parry from their impieties nor the error after it has been reproved.

The Latin and Greek texts of these letters are preserved in the Collectio Avellana as letters 139 and 140.

Furthermore, a third letter was written by the monks to the bishops which blames Severus for the attack and goes into more details on the attacks.

== Church ==
On 2 August 2025, the Maronite Church of Saint Maroun and the 350 Martyrs was consecrated and inaugurated by archbishop Hanna Rahmé, in Deir Al-Ahmar, Lebanon, with its first Mass being held on 3 August 2025. The church was built by the Maronite monks of Beit Maroun.

== See also ==
- Forty Martyrs of Sebaste
- 42 Martyrs of Amorium
- Hundred Thousand Martyrs of Tbilisi
