= The Rainbow Singer =

The Rainbow Singer is Irish author Simon Kerr's first novel. It was first published in June 2002. Simon Kerr also writes under the pseudonym Chris Kerr.

- Simon Kerr (2002). The Rainbow Singer. Theia. ISBN 0-7868-6798-1. (hardcover)
- Simon Kerr (2002). The Rainbow Singer. Phoenix. ISBN 0-7538-1338-6. (paperback)
