= Bibliography of Harry S. Truman =

This bibliography of Harry S. Truman is a selective list of scholarly works about Harry S. Truman, the thirty-third president of the United States (1945–1953). See also the bibliographies at Harry S. Truman, Presidency of Harry S. Truman, and Foreign policy of the Harry S. Truman administration.

== Historiography, memory and teaching ==
- Catsam, Derek. "The civil rights movement and the Presidency in the hot years of the Cold War: A historical and historiographical assessment." History Compass 6.1 (2008): 314-344 online.
- Griffith, Robert. "Truman and the Historians: The Reconstruction of Postwar American History." Wisconsin Magazine of History (1975) 59#1 pp: 20-47, covers both foreign and domestic policy. online[
- Kirkendall, Richard Stewart, ed. Harry's Farewell: Interpreting and Teaching the Truman Presidency (University of Missouri Press, 2004) online.
- Kirkendall, Richard S. ed. Harry S. Truman Encyclopedia (1990), comprehensive coverage by experts.
- Margolies, Daniel S., ed. (2012). A Companion to Harry S. Truman. Wiley-Blackwell. ISBN 978-1-4443-3141-7. 614pp; 27 essays by scholars focusing on historiography
- Kirkendall, Richard S. ed. Harry's Farewell: Interpreting and Teaching the Truman Presidency (2004) essays by scholars
- Levantrosser, William F. ed. Harry S. Truman: The Man from Independence (1986). 25 essays by scholars and Truman aides.
- McNay, John T. "The vibrant era from the depression to the cold war: the rich historiography of the Roosevelt and Truman years." Presidential Studies Quarterly 46.1 (2016): 208-212.
- Smith, Geoffrey S. "'Harry, We Hardly Know You': Revisionism, Politics and Diplomacy, 1945–1954," American Political Science Review 70 (June 1976), 560–582. Online at JSTOR

== Biographical ==
External videos
- Organization of American Historians panel on Truman biographies: "The participants discussed three recent biographies of President Truman by McCullough, Hamby and Ferrell. Four historians reviewed the books and two of the biographers responded to these critiques. They also discussed the larger issues associated with biography of leading historical figures. Ferrell's book is titled, Harry S. Truman: A Life, Hamby's is Man of the People: A Life of Harry S. Truman and McCullough's is Truman.", C-SPAN

- Algeo, Matthew (2009). Harry Truman's Excellent Adventure: The True Story of a Great American Road Trip. Chicago: Chicago Review Press. ISBN 978-1-55652-777-7. about a 1953 vacation trip covered by the media
- Burnes, Brian (2003). Harry S. Truman: His Life and Times. Kansas City, MO: Kansas City Star Books. ISBN 978-0-9740009-3-0.
- Dallek, Robert (2008). Harry S. Truman. New York: Times Books. ISBN 978-0-8050-6938-9.
- Dayton, Eldorus L. (1956). Give 'em Hell Harry: An Informal Biography of The Terrible Tempered Mr. T. New York: Devin-Adair Company.
- Donovan, Robert J. (1983). Tumultuous Years: 1949–1953. New York: W. W. Norton. ISBN 978-0-393-01619-2.
- Donovan, Robert J. (1996). Conflict and Crisis: The Presidency of Harry Truman, 1945–1948. Columbia, MO: University of Missouri Press. ISBN 978-0-8262-1066-1.
- Ferrell, Robert H. (1994). Harry S. Truman: A Life. University of Missouri Press. ISBN 978-0-8262-6045-1.
- Fleming, Thomas J. (1993). Harry S. Truman, President. New York: Walker & Co. ISBN 978-0-8027-8269-4.
- Frank, Jeffrey. The Trials of Harry S. Truman: The Extraordinary Presidency of an Ordinary Man, 1945-1953 (Simon and Schuster, 2022). online
- Gosnell, Harold Foote (1980). Truman's Crises: A Political Biography of Harry S. Truman. Westport, CT: Greenwood Press. ISBN 978-0-313-21273-4.

External videos
- Booknotes interview with David McCullough on Truman, July 19, 1992, C-SPAN

- Graff, Henry F., ed. (1996). The Presidents: A Reference History (2nd ed.). New York: Scribner Book Company. pp. 443–458. ISBN 978-0-684-80471-2.
- Grinder, Brian, and Dan Cooper. "The Personal Finances of Presidents, Part 2: Harry S. Truman." Financial History 144 (2023): 6-9. online
- Hamby, Alonzo L. Man of the People: A Life of Harry S. Truman (1995), a major scholarly study
- McCullough, David (1992). Truman. New York: Simon & Schuster. ISBN 978-0-671-86920-5.. best-selling detailed biography
- Miller, William Lee. Two Americans: Truman, Eisenhower, and a dangerous world (Alfred A Knopf, 2012).
- Pemberton, William E. Harry S. Truman: Fair Dealer and Cold Warrior (Twayne, 1989), short biography by a scholar.

== Foreign and defense policy ==
- Bickerton, Ian J. “President Truman’s Recognition of Israel.” American Jewish Historical Quarterly 58#2 (1968), pp. 173–240. online
- Casey, Steven. "Selling NSC-68: the Truman administration, public opinion, and the politics of mobilization, 1950–51." Diplomatic History 29.4 (2005): 655-690. online
- Divine, Robert A. "The Cold War and the Election of 1948," The Journal of American History, Vol. 59, No. 1 (Jun. 1972), pp. 90–110 in JSTOR
- Duiker, William J. (1994). U.S. Containment Policy and the Conflict in Indochina. Stanford, CA: Stanford University Press. ISBN 978-0-8047-2283-4.
- Gaddis, John Lewis. "Reconsiderations: Was the Truman Doctrine a Real Turning Point?" Foreign Affairs 1974 52(2): 386–402. ISSN 0015-7120
- Giangreco, D. M. " 'A Score of Bloody Okinawas and Iwo Jimas': President Truman and Casualty Estimates for the Invasion of Japan." Pacific Historical Review 72#1 (2003), pp. 93–132. online
- Hasegawa, Tsuyoshi. Racing the Enemy: Stalin, Truman, and the Surrender of Japan (2009)
- Heiss, Mary Ann, and Michael J. Hogan, eds. Origins of the National Security State and the Legacy of Harry S. Truman (Kirksville: Truman State University Press, 2015). xvi, 240 pp.
- Hogan, Michael J. A Cross of Iron: Harry S. Truman and the origins of the national security state, 1945-1954 (Cambridge University Press, 1998).
- Holloway, David (1994). Stalin and the Bomb: The Soviet Union and Atomic Energy 1939–1956. New Haven, CT: Yale University Press. ISBN 978-0-300-06664-7.
- Ivie, Robert L. "Fire, Flood, and Red Fever: Motivating Metaphors of Global Emergency in the Truman Doctrine Speech." Presidential Studies Quarterly 1999 29(3): 570–591. ISSN 0360-4918
- Judis, John B.: Genesis: Truman, American Jews, and the Origins of the Arab/Israeli Conflict. (Farrar, Straus & Giroux, 2014). ISBN 978-0-374-16109-5
- Kepley, David R. (1988). The Collapse of the Middle Way: Senate Republicans and the Bipartisan Foreign Policy, 1948–1952. Westport, CT: Greenwood Press. ISBN 978-0-313-25784-1.
- Lacey, Michael J. ed. The Truman Presidency (1989)
- LaFeber, Walter. America, Russia, and the cold war, 1945-1996 (8th ed, McGraw-Hill, 1997).
- Long, Stephen. The CIA and the Soviet Bloc: Political Warfare, the Origins of the CIA and Countering Communism in Europe (Bloomsbury, 2020).
- Maddox, Robert James. From War to Cold War: The Education of Harry S. Truman (Routledge, 2019) online.
- Maddox, R. J. "Truman, Poland, and the Origins of the Cold War". Presidential Studies Quarterly, (1987) 17(1), 27–41. [ online
- Matray, James. "Truman's Plan for Victory: National Self Determination and the Thirty-Eighth Parallel Decision in Korea," Journal of American History 66 (September 1979), 314–333. in JSTOR
- Matray, James I. Northeast Asia and the Legacy of Harry S. Truman: Japan, China, and the Two Koreas (2012)
- Merrill, Dennis. "The Truman Doctrine: Containing Communism and Modernity" Presidential Studies Quarterly 2006 36(1): 27–37. ISSN 0360-4918
- Nelson, Anna Kasten. "President Truman and the Evolution of the National Security Council." Journal of American History 72#2 (1985), pp. 360–78. online
- Offner, Arnold A. "'Another Such Victory': President Truman, American Foreign Policy, and the Cold War." Diplomatic History (1999) 23(2): 127–155. online
- Parry-Giles, Shawn J. The rhetorical presidency, propaganda, and the Cold War, 1945-1955 (Greenwood, 2002) online.
- Paterson, Thomas G. "Presidential foreign policy, public opinion, and Congress: the Truman years." Diplomatic History 3.1 (1979): 1-18.
- Pelz, Stephen. "When the Kitchen Gets Hot, Pass the Buck: Truman and Korea in 1950," Reviews in American History 6 (1978), 548–555. online
- Perret, Geoffrey. Commander in Chief: How Truman, Johnson, and Bush Turned a Presidential Power Into a Threat to America's Future (Macmillan, 2007) online.
- Pierpaoli Jr., Paul G. Truman and Korea: The Political Culture of the Early Cold War. (University of Missouri Press, 1999) online
- Rovere, Richard H. General MacArthur and President Truman: The Struggle for Control of American Foreign Policy (Routledge, 2022, reprint of 1951 book). online.
- Sandler, Stanley (1995). The Korean War: An Encyclopedia. New York: Taylor & Francis. ISBN 978-0-8240-4445-9.
- Schiff, Mel. "President Truman and the Jewish DPs, 1945–46: The Untold Story." American Jewish History 99#4 (2015), pp. 327–52. online
- Spalding, Elizabeth Edwards (2006). The First Cold Warrior: Harry Truman, Containment, and the Remaking of Liberal Internationalism. Lexington, KY: The University Press of Kentucky. ISBN 978-0-8131-2392-9.
- Theoharis, Athan. The Truman Presidency: The Origins of the Imperial Presidency and the National Security State (1979).
- Wainstock, Dennis D. Truman, MacArthur, and the Korean War (1999)
- Walker, J. Samuel. Prompt and Utter Destruction: Truman and the Use of Atomic Bombs against Japan (1997) online
- Walker, J. Samuel. "Recent Literature on Truman's Atomic Bomb Decision: A Search for Middle Ground" Diplomatic History 29#2 (2005) pp 311–334
- Webb, Clive. "Harry S. Truman and Clement Attlee: 'Trouble Always Brings Us Together'." The Palgrave Handbook of Presidents and Prime Ministers From Cleveland and Salisbury to Trump and Johnson (Cham: Springer International Publishing, 2022) pp. 157-178 on relations with prime minister of United Kingdom.
- Young, Ken; Schilling, Warner R. (2019). Super Bomb: Organizational Conflict and the Development of the Hydrogen Bomb. Ithaca, New York: Cornell University Press. ISBN 978-1-5017-4516-4.

== Politics and elections ==
- Divine, Robert A. "The Cold War and the Election of 1948," Journal of American History, 59#1 (1972), pp. 90–110 in JSTOR
- Ferrell, Robert H. (1994). Choosing Truman: The Democratic Convention of 1944. University of Missouri Press. ISBN 978-0-8262-7298-0.
- Fried, Richard M. (1990). Nightmare in Red: The McCarthy Era in Perspective. Oxford University Press. ISBN 978-0-19-504361-7.
- Leuchtenburg, William E. The White House Looks South: Franklin D. Roosevelt, Harry S. Truman, Lyndon B. Johnson (LSU Press, 2005).
- Parmet, Herbert S. The Democrats: The Years After FDR (Oxford University Press, 1976)
- Pietrusza, David (2011), 1948: Harry Truman's Improbable Victory and the Year that Changed America, New York: Union Square Press.
- Ryan, Halford R. Harry S. Truman: Presidential Rhetoric (1993)
- Savage, Sean J. Truman and the Democratic Party (1997).
- Schoenebaum, Eleanora W. ed. Political Profiles: The Truman Years (1978) 715pp; short biographies of 435 players in national politics 1945–1952.
- Sitkoff, Harvard. "Harry Truman and the election of 1948: The coming of age of civil rights in American politics." Journal of Southern History 37.4 (1971): 597-616 online.
- White, Philip. Whistle Stop: How 31,000 Miles of Train Travel, 352 Speeches, and a Little Midwest Gumption Saved the Presidency of Harry Truman (University Press of New England, 2014).

== Domestic issues ==
- Berman, William C. The politics of civil rights in the Truman administration (1970) online
- Bernstein, Barton J., ed. (1970). Politics and Policies of the Truman Administration (2nd ed.). Franklin Watts. ISBN 978-0-531-06328-6.
- Bernstein, Barton J., ed. (1969). "America In War and Peace: The Test of Liberalism". Towards A New Past: Dissenting Essays in American History. New York: Vintage Books. pp. 289–291. ISBN 978-0-394-70494-4. reprinted in Hamby 1974, pp. 52–68.
- Billington, Monroe. "Civil Rights, President Truman and the South." Journal of Negro History 58.2 (1973): 127-139. online
- Bolles, Blair (1952), How to Get Rich in Washington: Rich Man's Division of the Welfare State, New York: Norton.
- Boyer, Paul (1994). By the Bomb's Early Light: American Thought and Culture at the Dawn of the Atomic Age. Chapel Hill, NC: University of North Carolina Press. ISBN 978-0-8078-4480-9.
- Brooks, Karl Boyd, ed. The Environmental Legacy of Harry S. Truman, (Kirksville: Truman State University Press, 2009. xxxvi, 145 pp. ISBN 978-1-931112-93-2
- Dean, Virgil W. "Why not the Brannan plan?." Agricultural History (1996): 268–282. in JSTOR, on agriculture
- Daynes, Byron W. and Glen Sussman, White House Politics and the Environment: Franklin D. Roosevelt to George W. Bush (2010) pp 36–45.
- de Luna, Phyllis Komarek. Public versus Private Power during the Truman Administration: A Study of Fair Deal Liberalism (Peter Lang, 1997).
- Gardner, Michael R. Harry Truman and Civil Rights: Moral Courage and Political Risks. (Southern Illinois University Press, 2002). xx + 276 pp. ISBN 0-8093-2425-3. online review
- Hartmann, Susan M. Truman and the 80th Congress (1971)
- Heller, Francis H. Economics and the Truman Administration (1981)
- Juhnke, William E. “President Truman’s Committee on Civil Rights: The Interaction of Politics, Protest, and Presidential Advisory Commission.” Presidential Studies Quarterly19#3 (1989), pp. 593–610. online
- Koenig, Louis W. The Truman Administration: Its Principles and Practice (1956)
- Lacey, Michael J. ed. The Truman Presidency (1989)
- Lee, R. Alton; Truman and Taft-Hartley: A Question of Mandate. (University of Kentucky Press, 1966)
- Marcus, Maeva Truman and the Steel Seizure Case: The Limits of Presidential Power (1994)
- Matusow, Allen J. Farm policies and politics in the Truman years (Harvard University Press, 1967).
- Mazuzan, George T., and J. Samuel Walker. Controlling the atom: The beginnings of nuclear regulation, 1946-1962 ((U of California Press, 1985).
- Richardson, Elmo. Dams, Parks and Politics: Resource Development and Preservation the Truman-Eisenhower Era (1973).

== Primary sources ==
- Avner, Yehuda The Prime Ministers: An Intimate Narrative of Israeli Leadership (2010) (Chapter 9, A Walk with Harry Truman) ISBN 978-1-59264-278-6
- Ayers, Eben A. (1991). Ferrell, Robert H. (ed.). Truman in the White House: The Diary of Eben A. Ayers. University of Missouri Press. ISBN 978-0-8262-0790-6.
- Bernstein, Barton J., Ed. The Truman Administration: A Documentary History (1966); 2nd edition published as Politics and Policies of the Truman Administration (1970).
- Clifford, Clark; Holbrooke, Richard (1991). Counsel to the President. New York: Random House. ISBN 978-0-394-56995-6.
- Merrill, Dennis. ed. Documentary History of the Truman Presidency, (1995– ) 35 volumes; available in some large academic libraries.
- Miller, Merle Plain Speaking: An Oral Biography of Harry S. Truman (1974) Putnam Publishing Group. ISBN 0-399-11261-8. London: Gollancz Ltd. (1974) ISBN 0-575-01841-0 (Reprint (2005) by Black Dog & Leventhal Publishers. ISBN 1-57912-437-2)
- Neal, Steve ed. Miracle of '48: Harry Truman's Major Campaign Speeches & Selected Whistle-Stops (2003)
- Truman, Harry S. (1983). Ferrell, Robert H. (ed.). Dear Bess: The Letters From Harry to Bess Truman, 1910-1959. Norton. ISBN 978-0-8262-1203-0.
- Truman, Harry S. (1955). Memoirs: Year of Decisions. Vol. 1. Garden City, NY: Doubleday.
- Truman, Harry S. (1956). Memoirs: Years of Trial and Hope. Vol. 2. Garden City, NY: Doubleday.
- Truman, Harry S. (1960). Mr. Citizen. Independence Press. ISBN 978-0-8309-0095-4.
- Truman, Harry S. (1980). Ferrell, Robert H. (ed.). Off the Record: The Private Papers of Harry S. Truman. Harper & Row. ISBN 978-0-8262-1119-4.
- Truman, Harry S. (2002). Ferrell, Robert H. (ed.). The Autobiography of Harry S. Truman. University of Missouri Press. ISBN 978-0-8262-1445-4.
- Truman, Margaret. Harry S. Truman. William Morrow and Co. (1973). memoir by his daughter

== Online sources ==
- "National Affairs: Anniversary Remembrance". Time. July 2, 1951. Archived from the original on November 23, 2010. (subscription required)
- "McCarthyism v. "Trumanism"". Time. August 27, 1951. Archived from the original on October 12, 2007. (subscription required)
- "Democrats: The Way West". Time. September 15, 1952. Archived from the original on September 30, 2007. (subscription required)
- "The White Case Record". Time. November 30, 1953. Archived from the original on September 30, 2007.
- Fuchs, James R. "Oral History Interview with Edgar G. Hinde". Harry S. Truman Library & Museum.
- Hess, Jerry N. (November 21, 1972). "Oral History Interviews with Karl R. Bendetsen: General Counsel, Department of the Army, 1949; Assistant Secretary of the Army, 1950–52; Under Secretary of the Army, 1952". Oral Archives. Harry S. Truman Library & Museum. Archived from the original on August 24, 2012.
- Truman, Harry S. (July 21, 1947). "Harry S. Truman 1947 Diary". Harry S. Truman Library & Museum. Archived from the original on May 13, 2010.
- "Telegram, Joseph McCarthy to Harry S. Truman, February 11, 1950, with Truman's draft reply; McCarthy, Joseph; General File; PSF; Truman Papers". Harry S. Truman Library & Museum. February 11, 1950. Archived from the original on June 19, 2008.
- Kennan, George (1947). "The Sources of Soviet Conduct". Lectures on 20th Century Europe. History Guide. Archived from the original on May 2, 2014.
- Truman, Harry S. "Executive Order 9835 – Prescribing Procedures for the Administration of an Employees Loyalty Program in the Executive Branch of the Government". The American Presidency Project. University of California at Santa Barbara.
- Truman, Harry S. "Word Has Just Been Received: Truman Speaks on the Railroad Strike: 1948–1952". History Matters. George Mason University.

=== Audio and video sources ===
- 29 Audio/Video Clips of Harry Truman
- Audio clips of Truman's speeches

=== Truman on US postage stamps ===
- "Harry S. Truman Issue". Smithsonian Institution. May 8, 1973.
- "20-cent Truman". Smithsonian Institution. January 26, 1984.
- "Ameripex '86 Issue". Smithsonian Institution. May 22, 1986.
- "1995 World War II Issue". Smithsonian Institution. September 2, 1995.
- "1940s Celebrate The Century Issues". Smithsonian Institution. February 18, 1999.

== Other bibliographies ==
- Annotated bibliography for Harry S. Truman from the Alsos Digital Library for Nuclear Issues
