= Choosing Truman =

1994 book by historian Robert Hugh Ferrell

Choosing Truman: The Democratic Convention of 1944
- Author: Robert H. Ferrell
- Language: English
- Genre: Non-fiction
- Publisher: University of Missouri Press
- Publication date: 1994
- Publication place: United States
- Pages: 137
- ISBN: 978-0-8262-7298-0

Choosing Truman: The Democratic Convention of 1944 is a 1994 book by historian Robert Hugh Ferrell about the political convention in Chicago which nominated Franklin D. Roosevelt for his fourth election to the U.S. presidency, but jettisoned Vice President Henry A. Wallace in favor of Missouri Sen. Harry S. Truman. The choice was particularly significant because Roosevelt would die in office the following year, making Truman the 33rd president.

== Author ==
Ferrell, a professor emeritus at Indiana University and one of the country's leading historians, was widely considered the preeminent authority on the history of the Truman administration. He was a prolific author or editor of more than 60 books on a wide range of topics, including the U.S. presidency, World War I, and U.S. foreign policy and diplomacy. Ferrell devoted particular attention to Truman, writing or editing more than a dozen books on his life and presidency, including the 1983 New York Times bestseller Dear Bess: The Letters From Harry to Bess Truman, 1910-1959, the 1994 biography Harry S. Truman: A Life, 2002's The Autobiography of Harry S. Truman, and 1980's Off the Record: The Private Papers of Harry S. Truman.

== Synopsis ==
Ferrell recounts the intrigue and behind-the-scenes machinations during the convention—"devious, furtive, roundabout business"— that led to Wallace's ouster and Truman's rise. Roosevelt's failing health in 1944 was an open secret, and Democratic Party leaders were worried that whoever was his vice president would inevitably have to take over. Many party officials distrusted Wallace, particularly chairman Robert E. Hannegan, who "wanted to be known as the man who saved the country from Henry Wallace." He and other party leaders, including outgoing Frank C. Walker and treasurer Edwin W. Pauley, wanted to find an alternative choice. Roosevelt himself was an obstacle to this; he had come to see himself as "irreplaceable", Ferrell writes, and "refused to consider the possibility he might die" and considered his choice of running mate inconsequential in comparison to other pressing issues, such as World War II. Roosevelt's typically "secretive [and] manipulative" behavior also made it difficult for others to know his true intentions in the matter.

Instead of Wallace, several others were considered but rejected, including conservative South Carolina politician James F. Byrnes, a top Roosevelt aide and former Supreme Court justice; another Supreme Court justice, William O. Douglas; Kentucky Sen. Alben Barkley; and House Speaker Sam Rayburn of Texas. Truman, though he did not actively seek the nomination, was chosen by the party leaders, and Roosevelt agreed to the choice in an early meeting at the convention. However, Roosevelt confused the issue by later throwing support behind both Wallace and Byrnes. The outcome was in doubt for much of the convention, including a moment when the vice president's supporters started a chant of "We want Wallace!" that turned into "a shouting, cheering, volatile crowd of 35,000 people." When the vote was taken, Wallace was ahead after the first ballot, but by the third and final ballot, Truman had won decisively with 1,031 votes. The loss of the nomination would be the doom of Wallace's political career. The following year, Truman forced Wallace to resign as Secretary of Commerce, and he retired from politics soon after that. Wallace ran for President as the leader of the Progressive Party in 1948.

In his conclusion, Ferrell argues that the then-prevalent system of political bosses worked well in this case to navigate a difficult and complex decision, but that Roosevelt was unnecessarily manipulative and could have swung the election in a different direction. He also states that Truman actually did want the nomination but felt that his best chance was to seem disinterested, and that his feigned reluctance "was his armor" in winning the vice presidency.

== Critical response ==
Reaction to the book was positive.

Ohio University professor Alonzo Hamby, writing in the Indiana Magazine of History, called the book "'court history' of a type that would have been recognized by chroniclers of the doings and intrigues of the powerful at least since Machiavelli and Shakespeare." He also praised the book's depth, saying that "no one has researched this particular problem as intensively as Ferrell." Patrick J. Maney, in the Journal of Southern History, wrote that "Ferrell's engaging book with its memorable sketches of the key players helps clarify an undeniably important episode in the Roosevelt administration. ... bring[ing] convincing analysis and abundant fresh detail, most of it drawn from a variety of manuscript and oral history collections." Richard Kirkendall, writing in The Annals of Iowa, called the book "impressively researched, well-written, and forcefully argued," but felt that the book could have more closely examined why Roosevelt chose to break with Wallace, as well as the motivations of rank-and-file Democrats at the convention. Political scientist Nelson W. Polsby, in Presidential Studies Quarterly, wrote that "Ferrell is in full command of the politics of the era, and puts the episode into a well worked out historical context."
