= The Dying President =

1998 book by historian Robert Hugh Ferrell

The Dying President: Franklin D. Roosevelt, 1944–1945
- Author: Robert H. Ferrell
- Language: English
- Genre: Non-fiction
- Publisher: University of Missouri Press
- Publication date: 1998
- Publication place: United States
- Pages: 185
- ISBN: 978-0-8262-1171-2

The Dying President: Franklin D. Roosevelt, 1944–1945 is a 1998 book by historian Robert Hugh Ferrell about the cardiovascular illness which Franklin D. Roosevelt suffered during the last year of his life and presidency. Ferrell examines the lengths to which the president and his medical advisers went to keep the public in the dark about the illness, as well as the political and diplomatic problems that arose both from the illness and the secrecy. He argues that Roosevelt was too sick to have remained in office, and that his inability to work led to critical foreign-policy mistakes in the closing year of World War II and a failure to properly prepare Harry S. Truman to take over as president after Roosevelt's death. Ferrell drew on newly available diaries by Roosevelt's cousin and close confidante Daisy Suckley and Roosevelt's cardiologist in 1944–45, Dr. Howard G. Bruenn.

== Author ==
Ferrell, a professor emeritus at Indiana University, was a prolific author or editor of more than 60 books on a wide range of topics, including the U.S. presidency, World War I, and U.S. foreign policy and diplomacy. One of the country's leading historians, Ferrell was widely considered the preeminent authority on the administration of Harry S. Truman, and also wrote books about half a dozen other 20th-century presidents.

== Synopsis ==
Ferrell's book is one of several he wrote about health and secrecy in the U.S. presidency, along with 1992's Ill-Advised: Presidential Health and Public Trust and 1996's The Strange Deaths of President Harding. It looks at the circumstances surrounding Roosevelt's final illness, who died in 1945 of a cerebral hemorrhage brought on by his cardiovascular disease. Roosevelt was diagnosed with severe hypertension in March 1944, near the end of his third term in office, by White House physician Howard Bruenn. By the end, Roosevelt had difficulty concentrating, was easily tired, and could only work four hours a day at most, but still kept his health secret even from his family and Truman.

Ferrell argues that Roosevelt, a naturally secretive person, chose to hide the true nature of his serious condition rather than resign his office or allow others in his administration to take over his decision-making powers. "The president knew he was ill, even if he had delusions of immortality," wrote Ferrell.

Roosevelt's hypertension probably appeared years earlier than Bruenn's diagnosis, although it is impossible to say for sure since his medical records are missing. But he also went to great lengths to keep his health secret, including enlisting FBI director J. Edgar Hoover to pressure doctors into staying quiet. Roosevelt's motivations may have included a desire not to be slowed down, and fear that his illness would be seen as a weakness. Ferrell writes that maintaining such secrecy may have been necessary both for national security during wartime and for political expediency during Roosevelt's fourth run for the presidency. But he also notes that secret-keeping was characteristic of Roosevelt, who also hid his use of a wheelchair due to poliomyelitis from the public for years: "He had always been very much a self-contained person who confided in no one."

Ferrell puts some blame on Roosevelt's personal physician from 1933 to 1945, Admiral Ross McIntire, who Bruenn thought was "out of his depth" and made a "gross misdiagnosis" because he was not a heart specialist. The medical science behind diagnosing heart attacks was then in its infancy compared with today. No blood-pressure readings were apparently taken of Roosevelt until Bruenn took over as his cardiologist, by which point it may have been too late to make a difference. Moreover, McIntire actively helped Roosevelt keep his secret from others but also never told him exactly how sick he was. Roosevelt may have purposely refrained from asking too many questions about his own condition, so that he himself would not know the full extent of his illness. Ferrell calls McIntire's repeated statements that Roosevelt was healthy "remarkably false." He also notes that the disappearance of Roosevelt's medical records was suspicious and that McIntire was one of only three people who could unlock the safe at Bethesda Naval Hospital, where they were stored.

In his conclusion, Ferrell writes that Roosevelt's incapacity may have needlessly prolonged both World War II and the Holocaust, and weakened America's postwar position in Europe, China and Vietnam. He also criticizes Roosevelt for his treatment of Truman as "inconsequential," saying that his failure to "inform his successor of anything, military, diplomatic, or administrative" was "an invitation to national calamity."

== Critical response ==
Reaction to the book was positive. Historian John Lukacs, writing in the Los Angeles Times, called the book "painstaking and exceptionally researched" and "one of the most important, and telling, works" about Roosevelt. According to reviewer Dennis Dunn, the book:

argues persuasively that FDR was too ill (of cardiovascular disease) to be president and that his physical disability led to a series of misjudgments and mistakes in 1944-45, including a lack of study of the need for the use of the atomic bomb against Japan, a nonchalance regarding the evidence of the Holocaust crime, an inattention to China and Chinese Communism, a casual support of French involvement in Vietnam with all of the attendant consequences of that fatal mistake for American foreign policy in the postwar period, an inadvertent backing of the ridiculous Morgenthau Plan, and an unconscionable isolation of Truman.

Edmund Kallina, in The Florida Historical Quarterly, called the book "a devastating critique of FDR and his conduct in 1944–1945 … when he clearly no longer had the ability to carry out the duties of the office." James Cassedy, writing in Presidential Studies Quarterly, said the book gives "a rich, insightful, and informed context" of the events of Roosevelt's final year. He noted the difficulty of finding the truth about Roosevelt's health amid "a wide range of contemporary rumors and often misleading official reports," as well as "Roosevelt's own mask of denial about his illnesses." A review in the Journal of the American Medical Association said that "Ferrell's brief, tightly constructed book … makes abundantly clear that" Roosevelt's seemingly sudden death "was anything but an unexpected cosmic occurrence," but was "readily foreseeable in well-documented but equally well-concealed medical and nonmedical observations stretching back more than a year."

Judy Barrett Litoff, in the Register of the Kentucky Historical Society, was more critical, writing that she thought Ferrell's judgement of Roosevelt was too harsh and his conclusions were unconvincingly speculative.

== See also ==
- Original Sin, 2025 book about president Joe Biden's health decline
