= Off the Record: The Private Papers of Harry S. Truman =

1980 book of Truman's writings edited by historian Robert Hugh Ferrell

- Editor: Robert H. Ferrell
- Author: Harry S. Truman
- Language: English
- Genre: Non-fiction
- Publisher: Harper & Row
- Publication date: 1980
- Publication place: United States
- Pages: 448
- ISBN: 978-0-8262-1119-4
- Dewey Decimal: 973.918092
- LC Class: E742.5 .T62

Off the Record: The Private Papers of Harry S. Truman is a 1980 book edited by historian Robert Hugh Ferrell which collects writings and correspondence by Truman, the 33rd U.S. president, between 1945 and 1971. Historian Donald R. McCoy, writing in Presidential Studies Quarterly, called it a work of "great scholarly value … which is easily one of the most important and interesting books dealing with the recent Presidency published during the past decade."

== Editor ==
Ferrell, a professor emeritus at Indiana University and one of the country’s leading historians, was widely considered the preeminent authority on the history of the Truman administration. He was a prolific author or editor of more than 60 books on a wide range of topics, including the U.S. presidency, World War I, and U.S. foreign policy and diplomacy. Ferrell devoted particular attention to Truman, writing or editing more than a dozen books on his life and presidency, including the 1983 New York Times bestseller Dear Bess: The Letters From Harry to Bess Truman, 1910-1959, the 1994 biography Harry S. Truman: A Life, 2002's The Autobiography of Harry S. Truman, and 1994's Choosing Truman: The Democratic Convention of 1944.

== Synopsis ==
Ferrell compiled the book from a newly opened collection of several hundred boxes of Truman's papers that had been recently moved to the Harry S. Truman Presidential Library and Museum in Independence, Missouri. The material consists of diary entries and memoranda, mostly handwritten and informal, as well as personal letters, many of which were never sent because of Truman's habit of writing when angry, to let off steam. (Ferrell notes that Truman's infamous letter to music critic Paul Hume, who had panned a recent singing performance by Truman's daughter Margaret, "was just one among dozens of such epistles," most of which were caught before sending by Truman's secretaries or Truman himself.) Many of the letters are also sentimental ones to family or close friends. The collection covers the time period between Truman's accession to the presidency after the death of Franklin Roosevelt to his retirement and life as an elder statesman in the 1960s and early 1970s.

About two-thirds of the book covers the years of his presidency, 1945 to 1953. Much of the material deals with Truman's feelings about the political and military decisions he faced, such as the use of the atomic bomb. ("It seems to be the most terrible thing ever discovered, but it can be made the most useful.") These include his assessments of other world leaders including Joseph Stalin ("I liked the little son of a bitch") and Winston Churchill. The book also includes previously unpublished writing by Truman on the 1945 Potsdam Conference, when Truman, Stalin and Churchill met to discuss the postwar world order. Truman writes about domestic politics as well, such as his early support and later disappointment with Adlai Stevenson's 1952 presidential candidacy, and a terse apology to Dwight Eisenhower over foreign-policy disagreements. ("I am extremely sorry that you have allowed a bunch of screwballs to come between us.") The book also includes Truman's thoughts on more private and personal matters, such as the deaths of his mother in 1947 and mother-in-law in 1952.

== Critical response ==
Response to the book was mostly positive. Yale professor Gaddis Smith, writing in the magazine Foreign Affairs, called the book "readable and refreshing" and said it "adds many delightful details" to the conventional understanding of Truman. Joseph Anthony Imler, in the Wisconsin Magazine of History, called the book "a pleasure to read" which showcases Truman's "skill as a political strategist" and his common touch. Writing in The Register of the Kentucky Historical Society, John M. Carroll said the book highlighted Truman's "famous temper, biting sarcasm, and considerable wit." He praised Ferrell's work in compiling and editing Truman's writings, which he said "reveal a warm and kindly man" who loved his family and felt ambivalent about politics. "He was at times overwhelmed by the burdens of the presidency, yet seemed to revel in the struggles and challenges it posed for him." Barry D. Karl, in The American Historical Review, said that although "not designed and edited with a scholarly audience in mind," Ferrell's commentary was "lively, partisan, and generally helpful to those who do not know the period," and that the book "adds a great deal to our understanding of the personality of the man who succeeded the complex FDR."

Conversely, University of Massachusetts professor Robert Griffith, writing in Reviews in American History, called the book "highly disappointing" and that Ferrell's choice of which material to include ignored "sources that might suggest a darker side to Truman's personality and character."
