= Ill-Advised =

1992 book by historian Robert Hugh Ferrell

Ill-Advised: Presidential Health and Public Trust
- Author: Robert H. Ferrell
- Language: English
- Genre: Non-fiction
- Publisher: University of Missouri Press
- Publication date: 1992
- Publication place: United States
- Pages: 205
- ISBN: 978-0-8262-1065-4

Ill-Advised: Presidential Health and Public Trust is a 1992 book by historian Robert Hugh Ferrell examining politically motivated cover-ups of serious medical issues afflicting U.S. presidents while they were in office. Although Dwight Eisenhower is the main focus of the book, it covers the presidency for a century, from Grover Cleveland's mouth cancer in 1893 to the health of George H. W. Bush, then-current president when the book was first published. All of these instances, Ferrell argues, raised serious questions about the fitness of each president to hold office, as well as whether the presidents and their physicians violated the public trust in keeping the incidents secret.

== Author ==
Ferrell, a professor emeritus at Indiana University, was a prolific author or editor of more than 60 books on a wide range of topics, including the U.S. presidency, World War I, and U.S. foreign policy and diplomacy. One of the country's leading historians, Ferrell was widely considered the preeminent authority on the administration of Harry S. Truman, and also wrote books about half a dozen other 20th-century presidents.

== Synopsis ==
Ferrell describes the book as "a series of medical detective stories". The book looks at the history of medical coverups during seven White House administrations: Grover Cleveland's secret operation to treat his mouth cancer; Warren G. Harding's chronic heart condition; Franklin Roosevelt's coverup of his eventually fatal heart disease; Dwight D. Eisenhower's heart disease; John F. Kennedy's Addison's disease; the problems raised by Ronald Reagan's foiled assassination, 1984-85 colon cancer, and 1987 prostate surgery; and George Bush's 1991 arrhythmia diagnosis and a 1992 incident in which he became violently ill during a dinner with the Japanese prime minister. In some cases, Ferrell writes, their health was poor enough that they should not have run for office at all. In others, physicians' incompetence or an excessive desire for secrecy may have prevented proper treatment of illnesses and contributed to early death.

Ferrell devotes the largest section of the book, nearly 100 pages, to Eisenhower's heart attacks, stroke, and Crohn's disease, drawing largely on the account of Brigadier General Thomas W. Mattingly, Eisenhower's cardiologist from 1952 until his death in 1969. Mattingly's account is particularly critical of Eisenhower's personal physician, Howard Snyder. Mattingly believed Snyder had lied about the severity of two incidents in 1949 and 1953—which Snyder called gastrointestinal events, but Mattingly believed were heart attacks—perhaps even removing or altering files to protect Eisenhower's political future.

The second-longest section of the book covers Franklin Roosevelt's declining health from 1943 to 1945, when he died of a massive cerebral hemorrhage. Roosevelt's medical issues were kept from the public for reasons of military secrecy during World War II, as well as to ensure his re-election as president in 1944. The cover-up, Ferrell writes, was orchestrated by Roosevelt's personal physician, Admiral Ross McIntire, who Ferrell accuses of "lying about his patient" in his book White House Physician and "almost certainly remov[ing] the president's medical records from the safe at Bethesda." Ferrell would later write much more extensively on the topic in his 1998 book The Dying President: Franklin D. Roosevelt, 1944-1945.

Ferrell writes that, in his opinion, it is "impossible to escape the conviction" that both Eisenhower and Roosevelt, despite serious health concerns while running for what would be their final terms as president, failed to properly consider whether their running mates (Richard Nixon and Harry S. Truman, respectively) were truly qualified to take over as president if necessary.

Ill-Advised was one of several books Ferrell wrote about health and secrecy in the U.S. presidency, along with The Dying President and 1996's The Strange Deaths of President Harding.

== Critical response ==
Reaction to the book was positive.

Dr. Hugh L'Etang, writing in the journal Politics and the Life Sciences, said that Ferrell wrote "with the zeal of a prosecuting counsel" and "must be commended for locating hitherto undisclosed sources and for showing that the accepted version of events must continue to be challenged." William Link, in the Southwestern Historical Quarterly, called the book "a significant addition" to the study of illness among world leaders, "convincingly demonstrat[ing]" that medical coverups are a serious and pervasive issue. He singled out the Eisenhower section of the book as "one of the most detailed presidential medical histories ever written." Barbara Kellerman, in Presidential Studies Quarterly, called the book "a welcome addition to the field of leadership studies" while criticizing its brevity. Emory University professor James Harvey Young, writing in the Indiana Magazine of History, said that Ferrell's writing "has a crisp explicitness and a forthrightness in making judgments." Herbert Abrams, in the Journal of American History, called Ill-Advised "well organized and solidly documented ... the narrative is absorbing, while the recounting of the episodes of illness is generally accurate and authoritative."

Conversely, some writers felt that Ferrell did not spend enough time on the other presidents covered in the book. Stephen Ambrose, writing in American Historical Review, called the Eisenhower material "remarkably detailed" and revealed previously unknown information about the severity of Eisenhower's condition. However, Ambrose said, "while Ferrell is convincing in his description of Eisenhower's heart and stomach problems, he does not convince me that the problems hampered Eisenhower's performance." Ambrose also felt that Ferrell's writings on the other six presidents covered little new ground, and that the book could have examined in more detail how the Twenty-fifth Amendment, which covers presidential disability, might have come into play. Similarly, Kirkus Reviews called the sections on Kennedy, Reagan, and Bush "very brief and not well-substantiated", and complained that the focus on Eisenhower meant that the book could not "conclusively demonstrate" a wider pattern of cover-ups.
