= John Garry Clifford =

American historian (1942–2014)

John Garry Clifford (1942 – 26 March 2014) was an American historian and professor of political science at the University of Connecticut.

== Life ==
Born in Massachusetts, he earned his B.A. from Williams College (1964) and his Ph.D. in history from Indiana University (1969). His doctoral advisor was the historian Robert H. Ferrell. He also taught at the University of Tennessee and Dartmouth College and has participated in two National Endowment for the Humanities seminars for high school teachers at the Franklin D. Roosevelt Presidential Library and Museum.

He taught at the University of Connecticut, with an interest in American diplomacy. Clifford has served on the editorial board of Diplomat History as well as on the editorial board of the Modern War Series of the University Press of Kansas.

He was until his death, writing a book on FDR and American intervention in World War II.

== Awards ==
- 1971 Frederick Jackson Turner Award

== Works ==
- John Garry Clifford (1969). The Plattsburg training camp movement, 1913-1917. Indiana University.
- John Garry Clifford (1972). The citizen soldiers: the Plattsburg training camp movement, 1913-1920. University Press of Kentucky. ISBN 978-0-8131-1262-6.
- John Garry Clifford; Samuel R. Spencer (1986). The first peacetime draft. University Press of Kansas. ISBN 978-0-7006-0305-3.
- Thomas G. Paterson; John Garry Clifford (1995). American foreign relations: a history to 1920. D.C. Heath. ISBN 978-0-669-35156-9.
- John Garry Clifford; Theodore A. Wilson, eds. (2007). Presidents, diplomats, and other mortals: essays honoring Robert H. Ferrell. University of Missouri Press. ISBN 978-0-8262-1747-9.
