= Peace in Their Time =

1952 book by historian Robert H. Ferrell

Peace in Their Time: The Origins of the Kellogg-Briand Pact
- Author: Robert H. Ferrell
- Language: English
- Genre: Non-fiction
- Publisher: Yale University Press
- Publication date: 1952
- Publication place: United States
- ISBN: 978-0393004915
- OCLC: 254418

Peace in Their Time: The Origins of the Kellogg-Briand Pact is a 1952 book by historian Robert H. Ferrell tracing the diplomatic, political and cultural events in the aftermath of World War I which led to the Kellogg–Briand Pact of 1928, an international agreement to end war as a means of settling disputes among nations. Ferrell's first book, Peace in Their Time elaborates on and extends Ferrell's 1951 Ph.D. dissertation, The United States and the Origins of the Kellogg-Briand Pact, which won Yale's John Addison Porter Prize for original scholarship. Peace in Their Time itself went on to win the American Historical Association's 1952 George Louis Beer Prize for outstanding historical writing. Ferrell would go on to become a professor at Indiana University and one of the most prominent historians in America, and wrote or edited more than 60 other books on historical topics. Historian Lawrence Kaplan praised Peace in Their Time as a harbinger of the high quality of Ferrell's subsequent career, stating that it "contained the special qualities that animated all his future work."

To research the book, Ferrell found manuscripts and other primary source material in the National Archives as well as eight different archives and private collections. One of the main sources for the book was William Castle's previously unpublished diaries from his time as assistant secretary of state from 1927 to 1929, during the presidency of Calvin Coolidge.

== Synopsis ==
Peace in Their Time examines the state of international diplomacy and the conditions in the years immediately after World War I which led to the Kellogg-Briand Pact, a treaty between the war's major combatants which was intended to prevent any such destructive conflagration from happening again. Although the treaty would eventually be signed by many nations, the two countries most responsible for its development were France and the United States. Ferrell details the complex discussions between the respective French and American diplomats, noting that the pact was influenced not only by the competing national interests of the main signatories, but the increasingly vocal pacifist movements that emerged after WWI, concluding that the pact "was the peculiar result of some very shrewd diplomacy and some very unsophisticated popular enthusiasm for peace." The agreement, in its early version, was presented by French foreign minister Aristide Briand as a bilateral antiwar treaty between France and the United States known as the "Pact of Perpetual Friendship." Although one of the victors of WWI, France's postwar position was "precarious," Ferrell writes, since its former enemy Germany had twice its population and considerable industrial capacity which could (and would) eventually be turned towards military production. Hence, the French sought alliances with other nations, and with the Pact of Perpetual Friendship, Briand hoped to secure either an American alliance or at least a guarantee of neutrality. The U.S. government, still isolationist, was resistant to becoming too embroiled in European politics, and Secretary of State Frank B. Kellogg counterproposed a multilateral treaty renouncing war in general terms. Neither the French or American governments truly wanted a multilateral pact, writes Ferrell, but the French felt forced into accepting it lest they seem to reject their own stated aim for universal peace. And the pressure brought on by the popularity of worldwide peace movements increased pressure on diplomats to make the pact happen, even as they felt that it was little more than, in Castle's words, "a big, peaceful gesture."

Ferrell kept the focus of Peace in Their Time strictly on the origins and signing of the Kellogg–Briand Pact, and does not assess its future influence and success or failure, calling that "an extremely interesting portion of history which can perhaps be dealt with in another work."

== Critical response ==
The book was received positively by most reviewers. Writing in the Journal of American History, Richard W. Leopold of Northwestern University called the book "a model study" written with "verve and distinction" and "eminently fair." "This may not be the last book on the subject, but it should be," Leopold concluded. The American Political Science Review called the book "an interesting and detailed addition to the history of the peace movement." Diplomatic historian William Appleman Williams, writing in The American Historical Review, said that he felt "keen regret" that the book did not quote Castle's diaries even more extensively, and compared the book unfavorably with John Edgar Stoner's 1943 book S.O. Levinson and the Pact of Paris. Writing for the Journal of Modern History, E.C. Helmreich praised Peace in Their Time as "a very competent study" and "a useful survey of all the peace movements and organizations in the United States in the early twenties." However, he felt that the book's focus on the origins of the pact left unexplored what effect the pact had on international diplomacy after its ratification. Writing in the online European Journal of American Studies, Dario Fazzi called Ferrell's book "a classic" study of American interwar pacifism.
