= Ross Gregory (historian) =

American historian

Ross Gregory is an American historian.

== Life ==
He served in the U.S. Army from 1954 to 1956. He graduated from Indiana University Bloomington earned his B.A., M.A. and Ph.D. His doctoral advisor was the historian Robert H. Ferrell. He taught at West Virginia University Institute of Technology, and at Western Michigan University from 1966 to 2005.

== Awards ==
- 1969 Frederick Jackson Turner Award

== Works ==
- Walter Hines Page: Ambassador to the Court of St. James’s, University Press of Kentucky, 1970 (reprint ACLS History E-Book Project, 2008, ISBN 978-1-59740-421-1)
- The Origins of American Intervention in the First World War, Norton, 1971
- Almanacs of American Life: Cold War America 1945-1990. Facts on File. August 1995. ISBN 978-0-8160-2532-9.
