= 1944 Democratic National Convention =

U.S. political event held in Chicago, Illinois

- 1944 presidential election
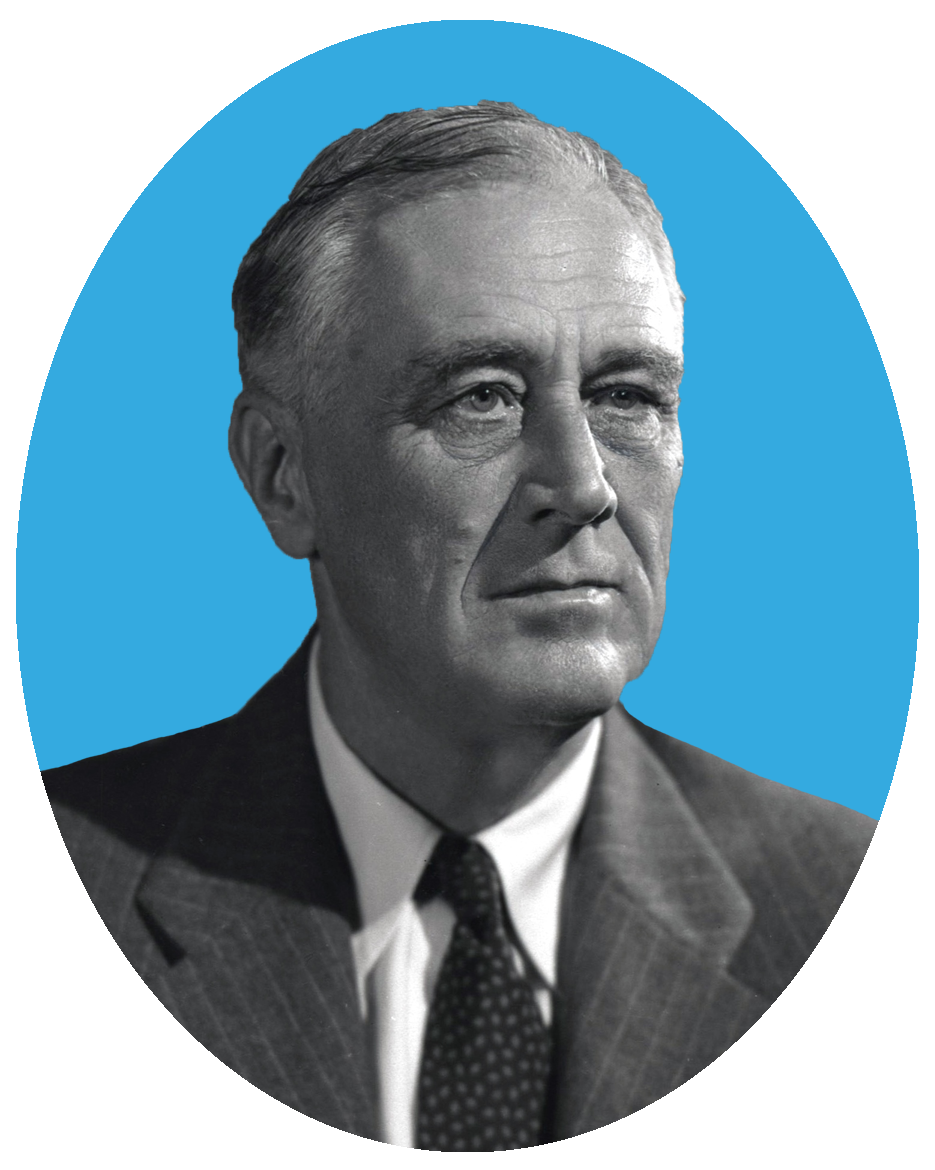
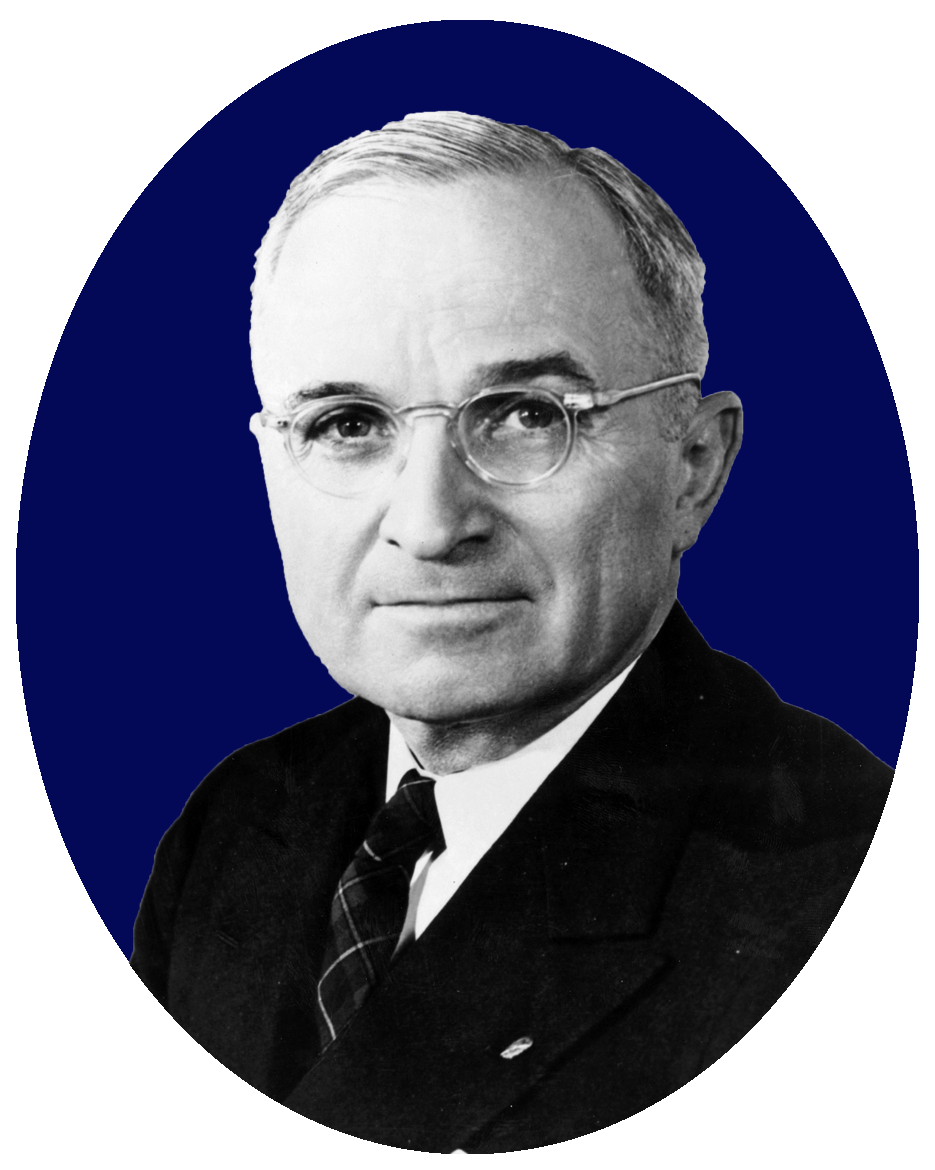
- Nominees; Roosevelt and Truman

Convention
- Dates: July 19–21, 1944
- City: Chicago, Illinois
- Venue: Chicago Stadium

Candidates
- Presidential nominee: Franklin D. Roosevelt of New York
- Vice-presidential nominee: Harry S. Truman of Missouri

Voting
- Total delegates: 1,176
- Votes needed for nomination: 589 (majority)
- Results (president): Roosevelt (NY): 1,086 (92.35%); Byrd (VA): 89 (7.56%); Farley: 1 (0.09%)
- Results (vice president): Truman (MO): 1,031 (87.67%); Wallace (IA): 105 (8.93%); Cooper (TN): 26 (2.21%); Barkley (KY): 6 (0.51%); Others: 7 (0.6%)

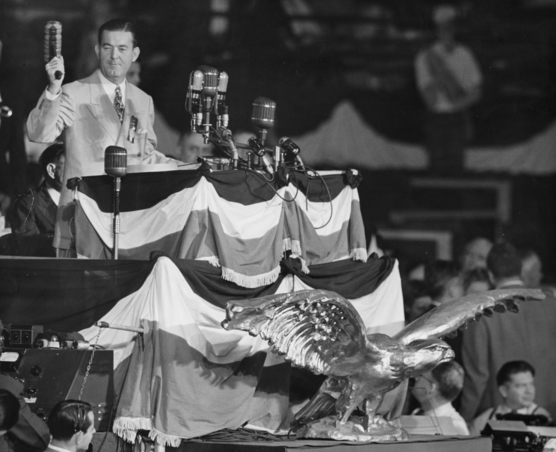
Robert E. Hannegan opening the convention

The 1944 Democratic National Convention was held at the Chicago Stadium in Chicago, Illinois from July 19 to July 21, 1944. The convention resulted in the nomination of President Franklin D. Roosevelt for an unprecedented fourth term. Senator Harry S. Truman of Missouri was nominated for vice president. It was the fifth time that Roosevelt had been nominated on the Democratic ticket for vice president (1920) or president (1932, 1936, and 1940). Roosevelt's five appearances on his party's ticket matched the major-party American standard of Richard Nixon, a Republican who had been nominated for vice president twice (1952 and 1956) and president three times (1960, 1968, and 1972). The keynote address was given by Governor Robert S. Kerr of Oklahoma, in which he "gave tribute to Roosevelt's war leadership and New Deal policies."

== Presidential nomination ==
=== Presidential candidates ===
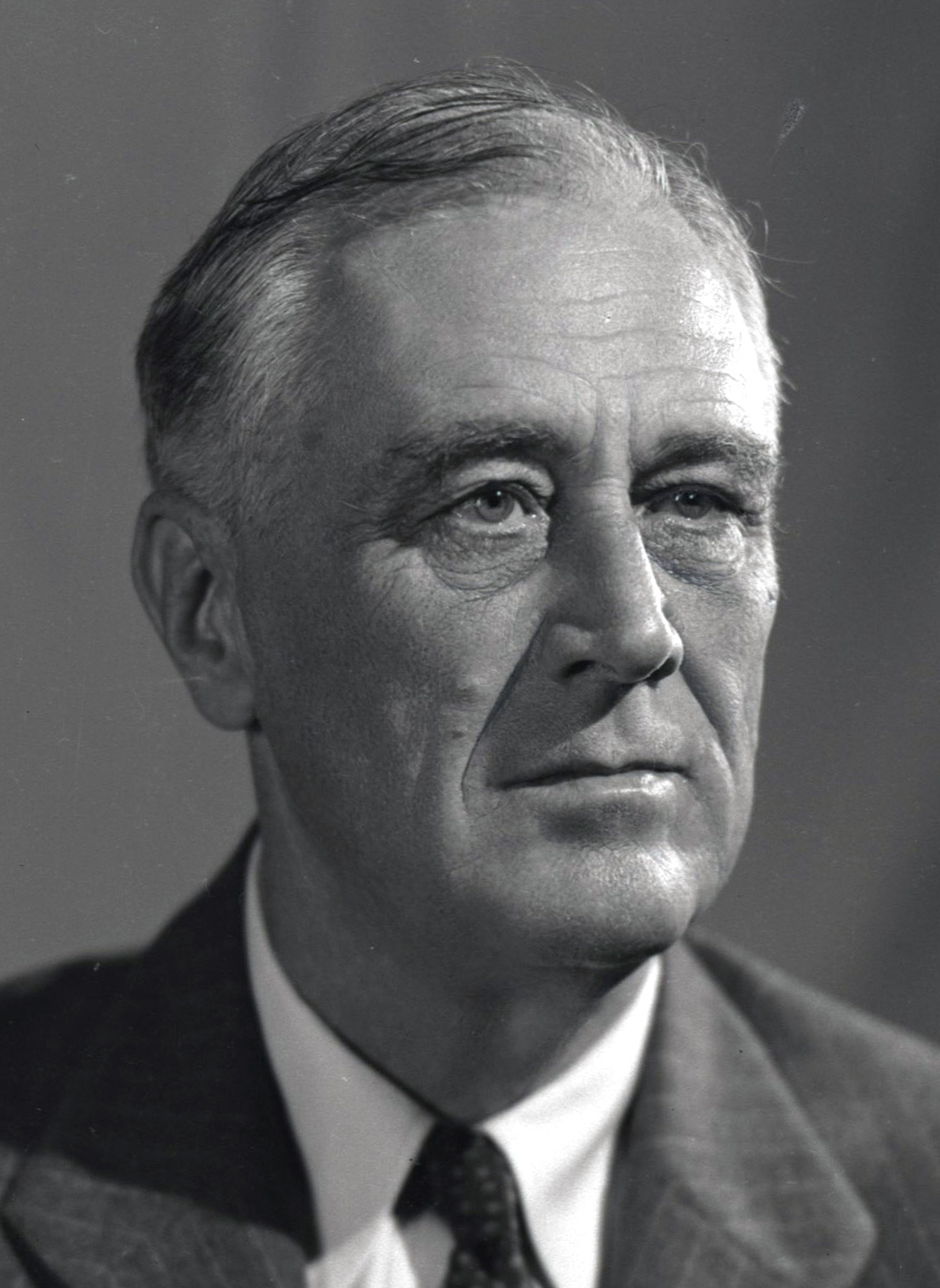
President
Franklin D. Roosevelt
of New York

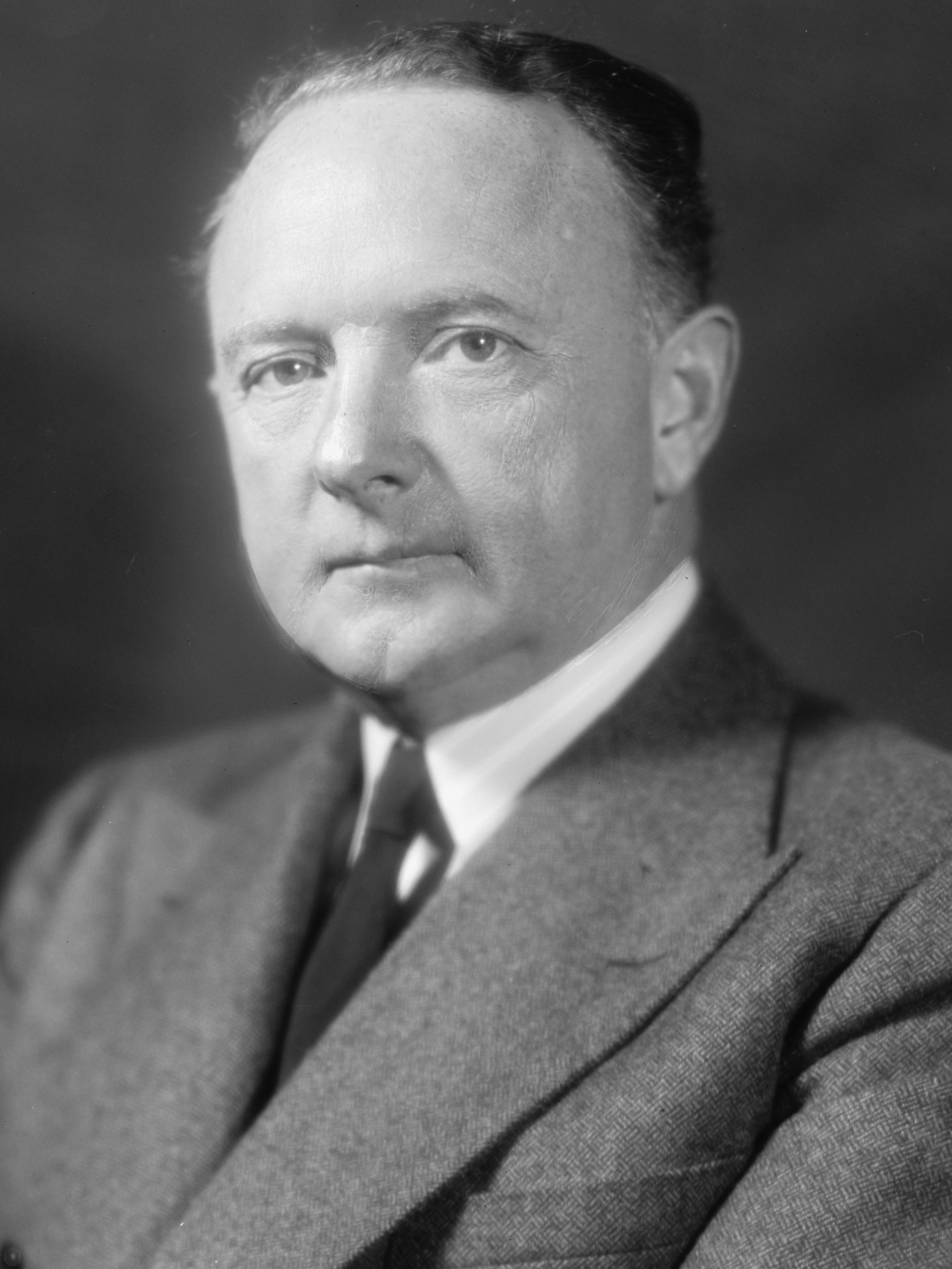
Senator
Harry F. Byrd
of Virginia
(Did not actively run)

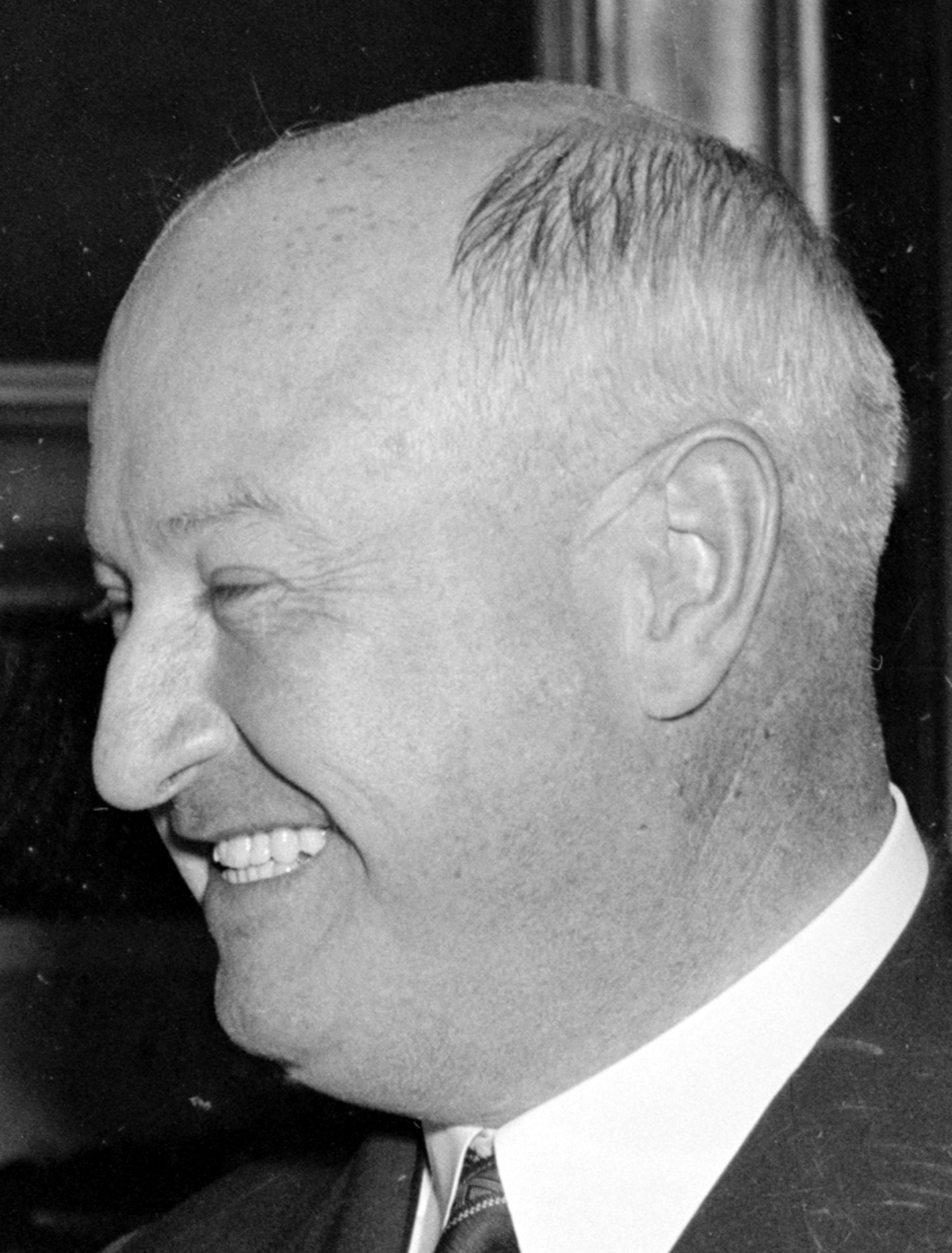
Former
Postmaster General
James Farley
of New York
(Not Nominated)

Unlike the previous convention, President Roosevelt faced no serious opposition for a fourth term, with the country's active involvement in World War II and the consequent need for stable leadership considered a more pressing issue than any concerns about his remaining in office. Several Southern delegates who were opposed to Roosevelt's racial policies tried to draft Virginia senator Harry F. Byrd to run for the presidential nomination, but Byrd decided against actively campaigning against the President. In the end, Byrd did win more delegates than any of the candidates who had tried to run against Roosevelt four years prior, but still fell far short of seriously challenging for the nomination.

=== Balloting ===
Roosevelt was nominated on the first ballot:

Presidential Balloting
Candidate	1st
Roosevelt	1,086
Byrd	89
Farley	1

Presidential Balloting / 2nd Day of Convention (July 20, 1944)

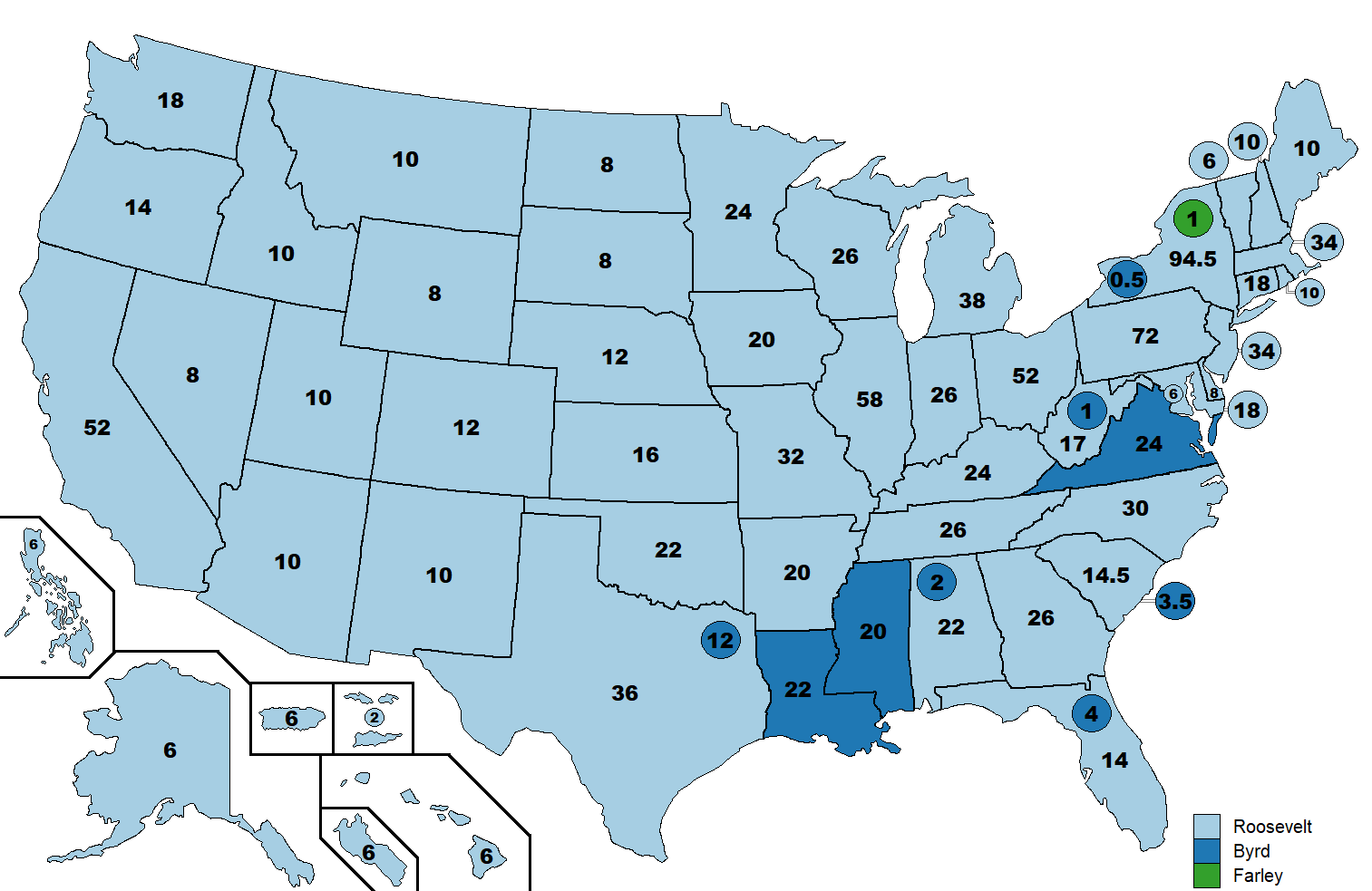
1st Presidential Ballot

=== Acceptance speech ===
Roosevelt delivered his acceptance speech remotely, from a Pacific Coast naval base. This was the last time a major party presidential candidate accepted that person's nomination remotely for a period of 76 years until Joe Biden accepted his nomination in 2020 from a set in his home town of Wilmington, Delaware due to the COVID-19 pandemic in the United States.

== Vice Presidential nomination ==
=== Vice Presidential candidates ===
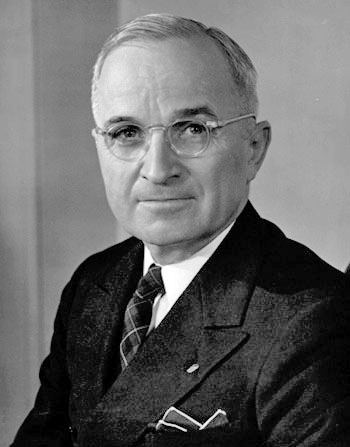
Senator
Harry S. Truman
of Missouri

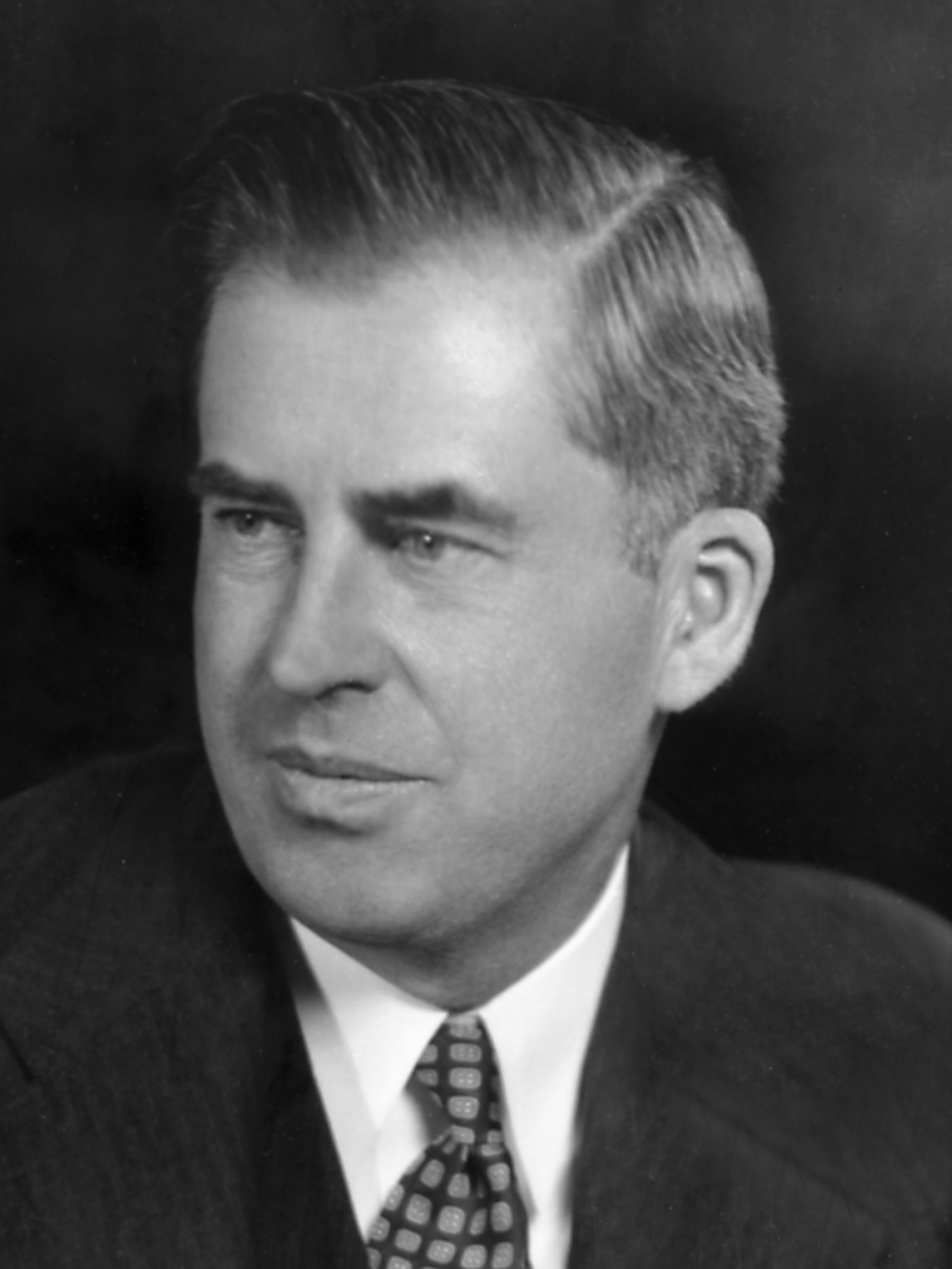
Vice President
Henry A. Wallace
of Iowa

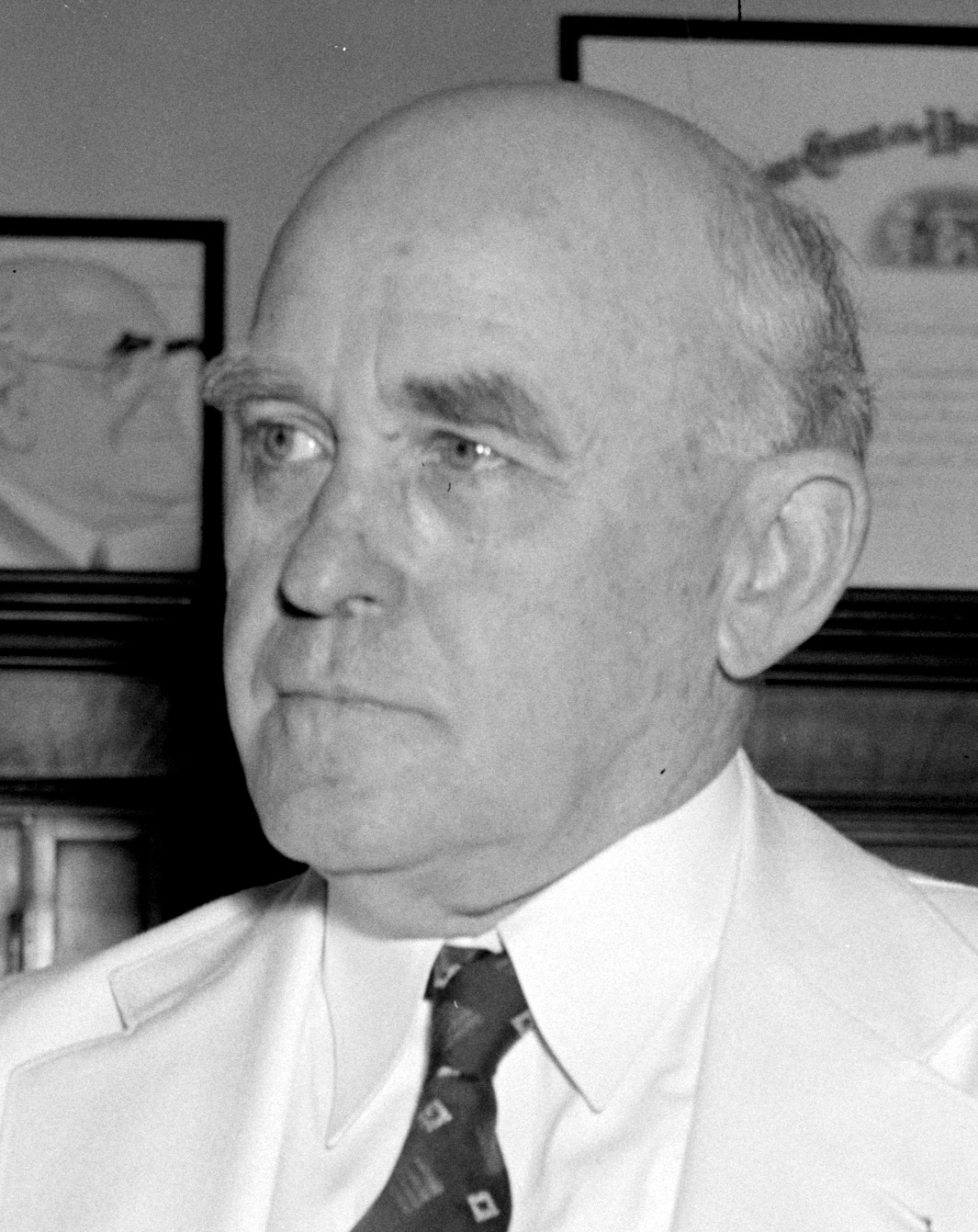
Senator
John H. Bankhead II
of Alabama

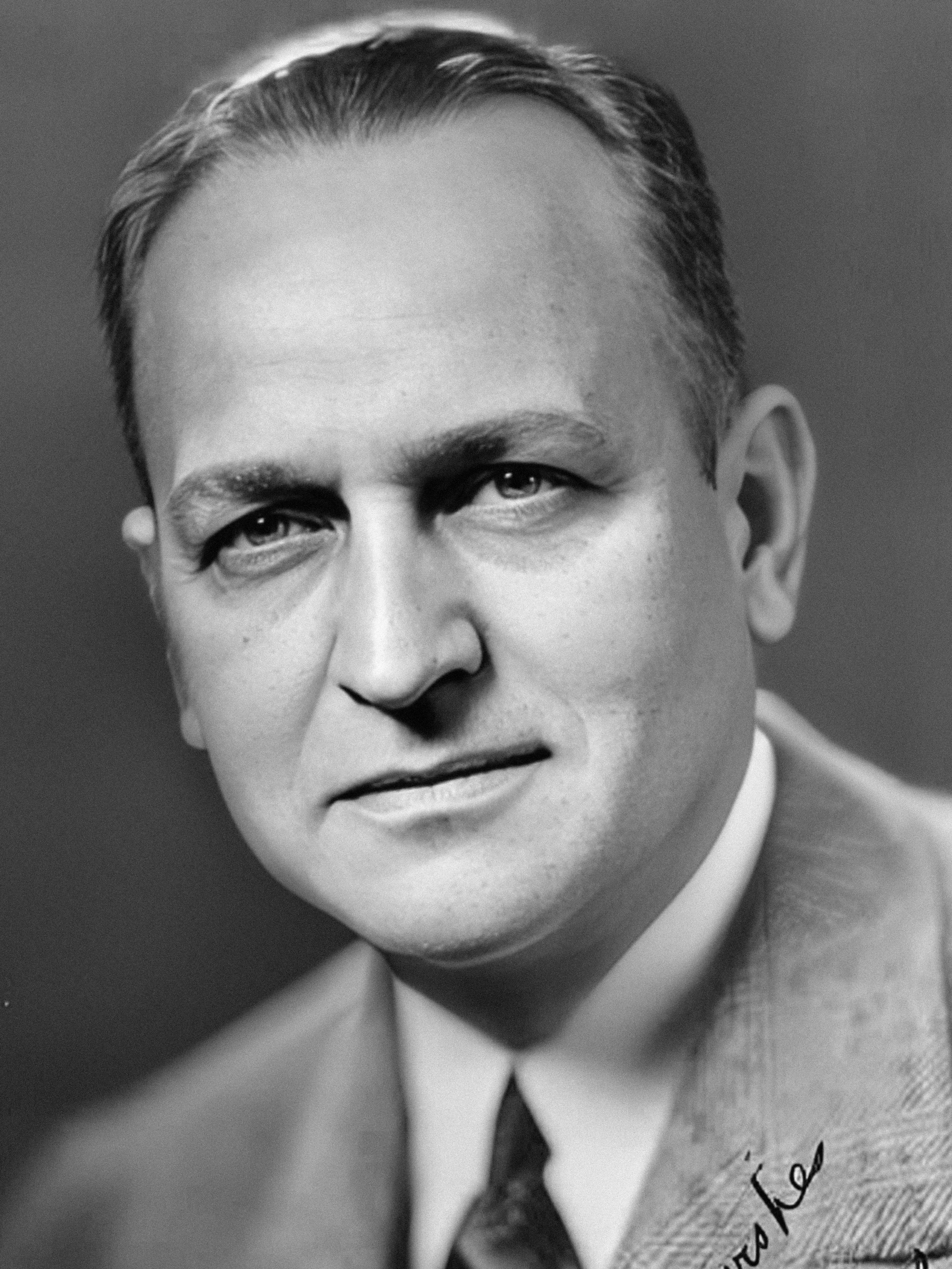
Senator
Scott W. Lucas
of Illinois

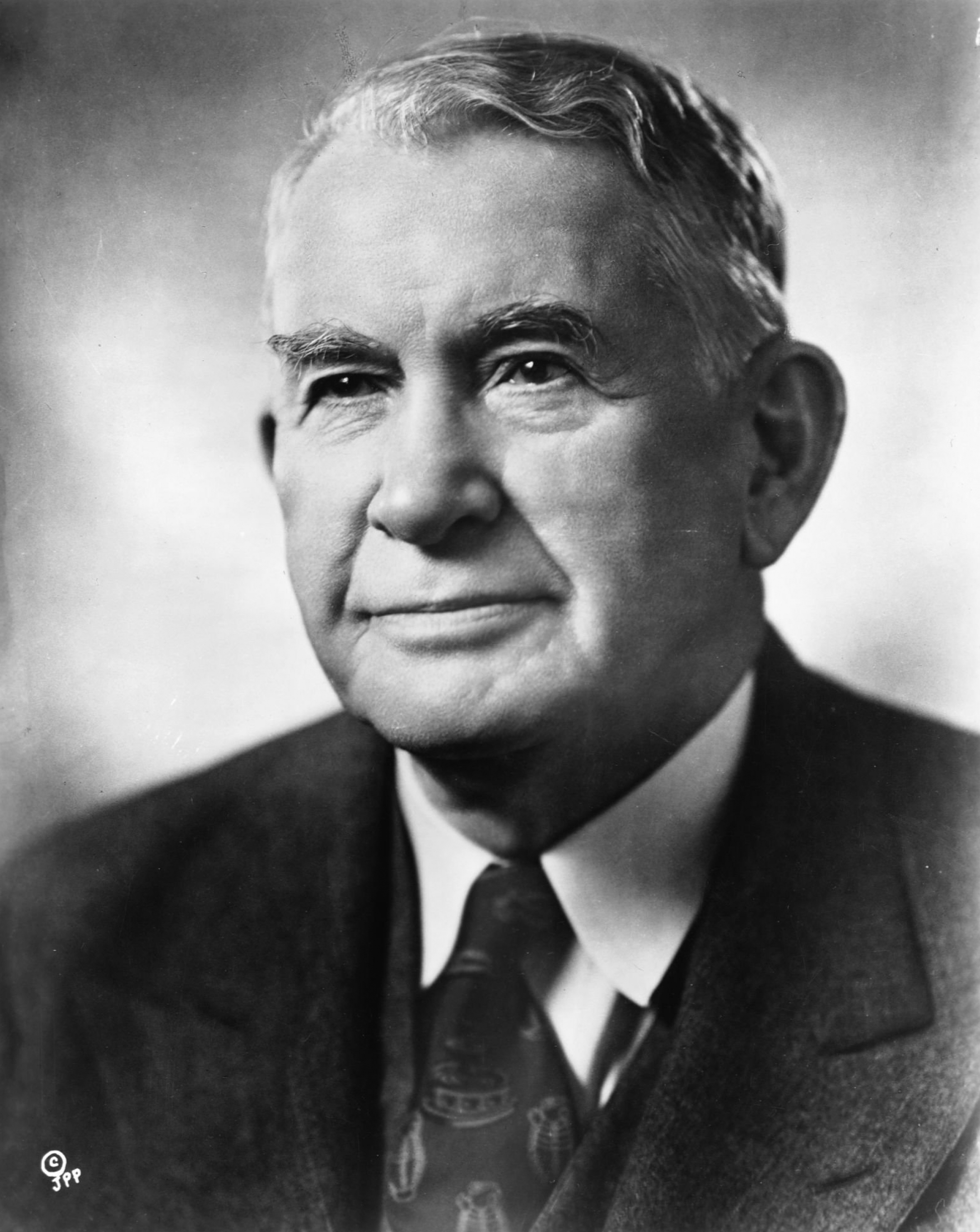
Senate Majority Leader
Alben W. Barkley
of Kentucky

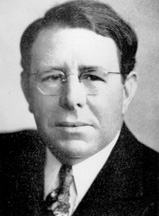
Governor
J. Melville Broughton
of North Carolina

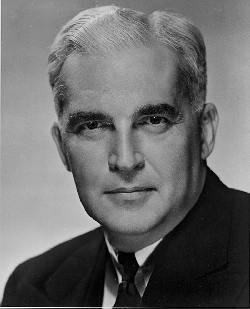
WMC Chairman
Paul V. McNutt
of Indiana

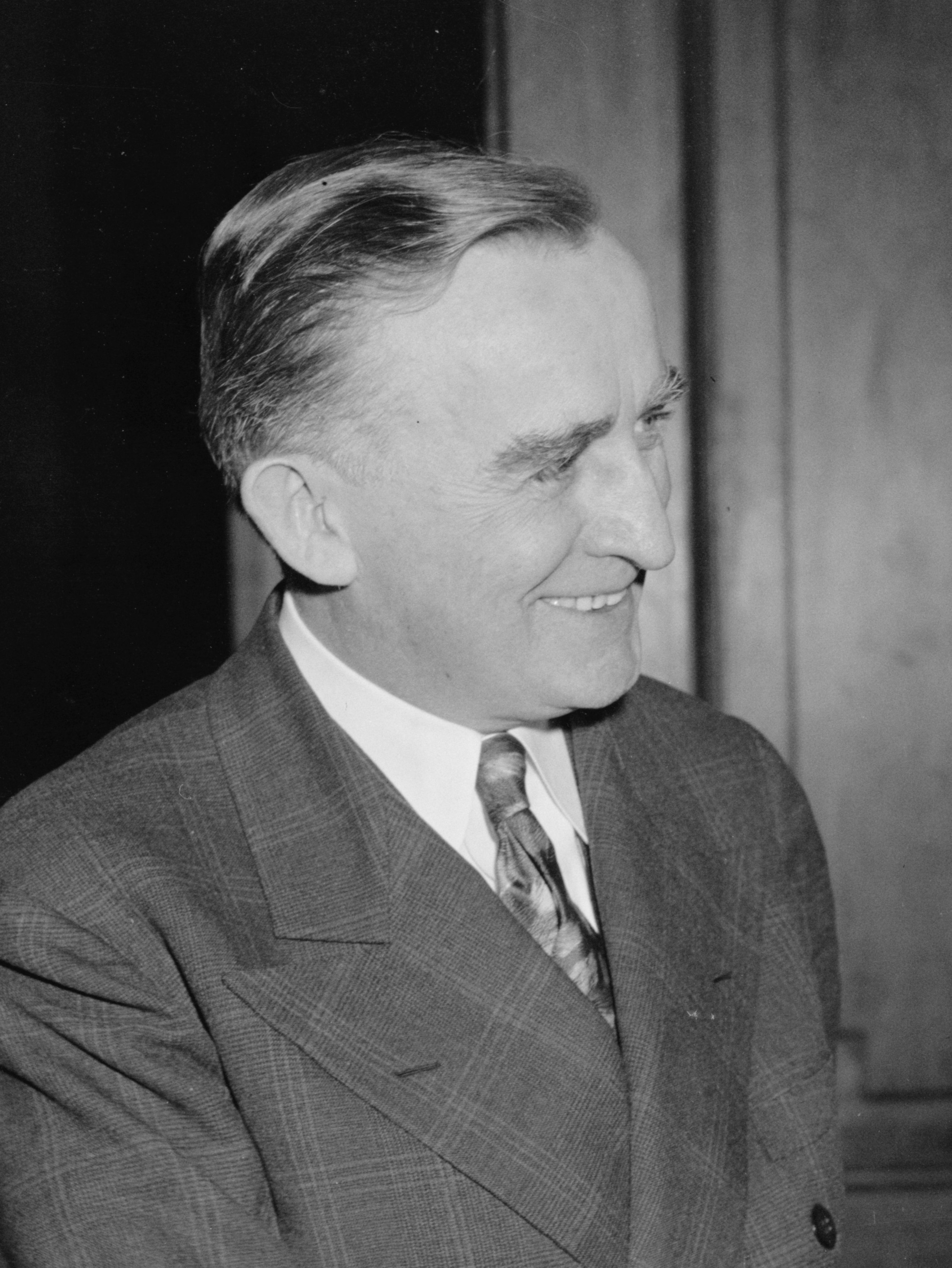
Senator
Joseph C. O'Mahoney
of Wyoming

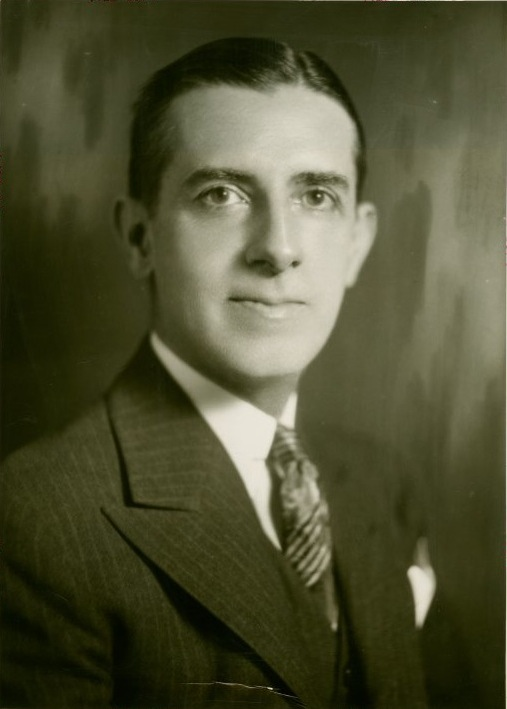
Governor
Prentice Cooper
of Tennessee

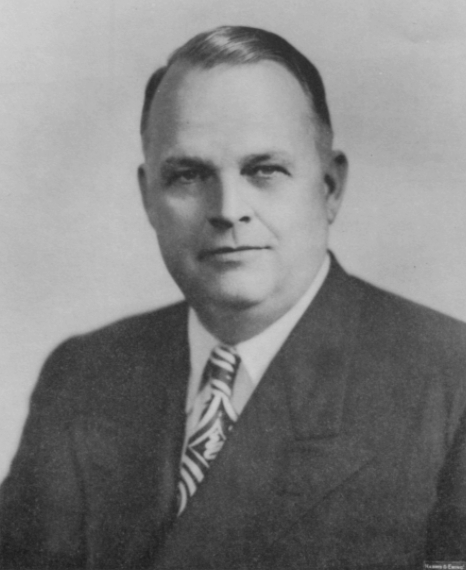
Governor
Robert S. Kerr
of Oklahoma

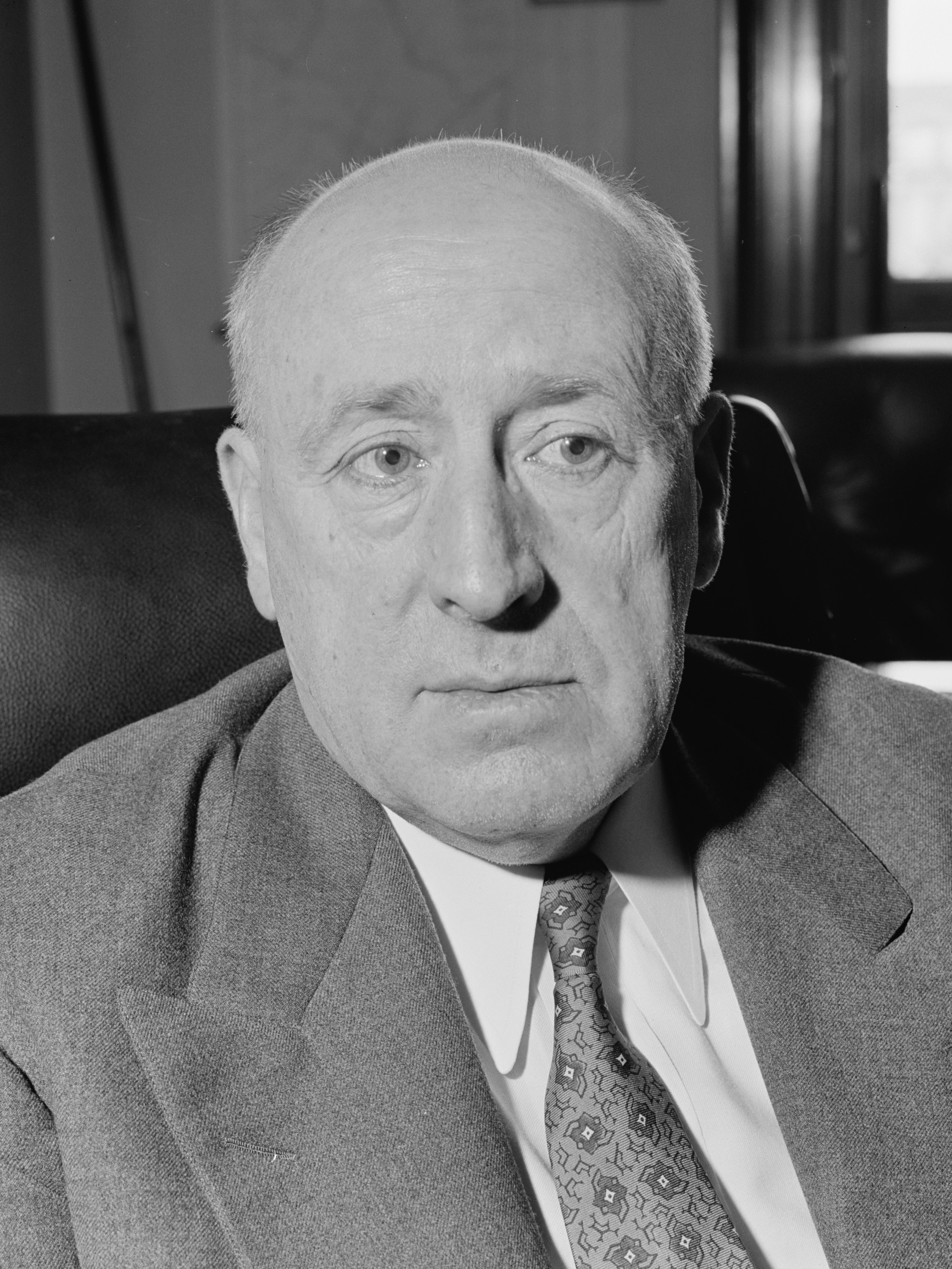
Senator
Elbert D. Thomas
of Utah

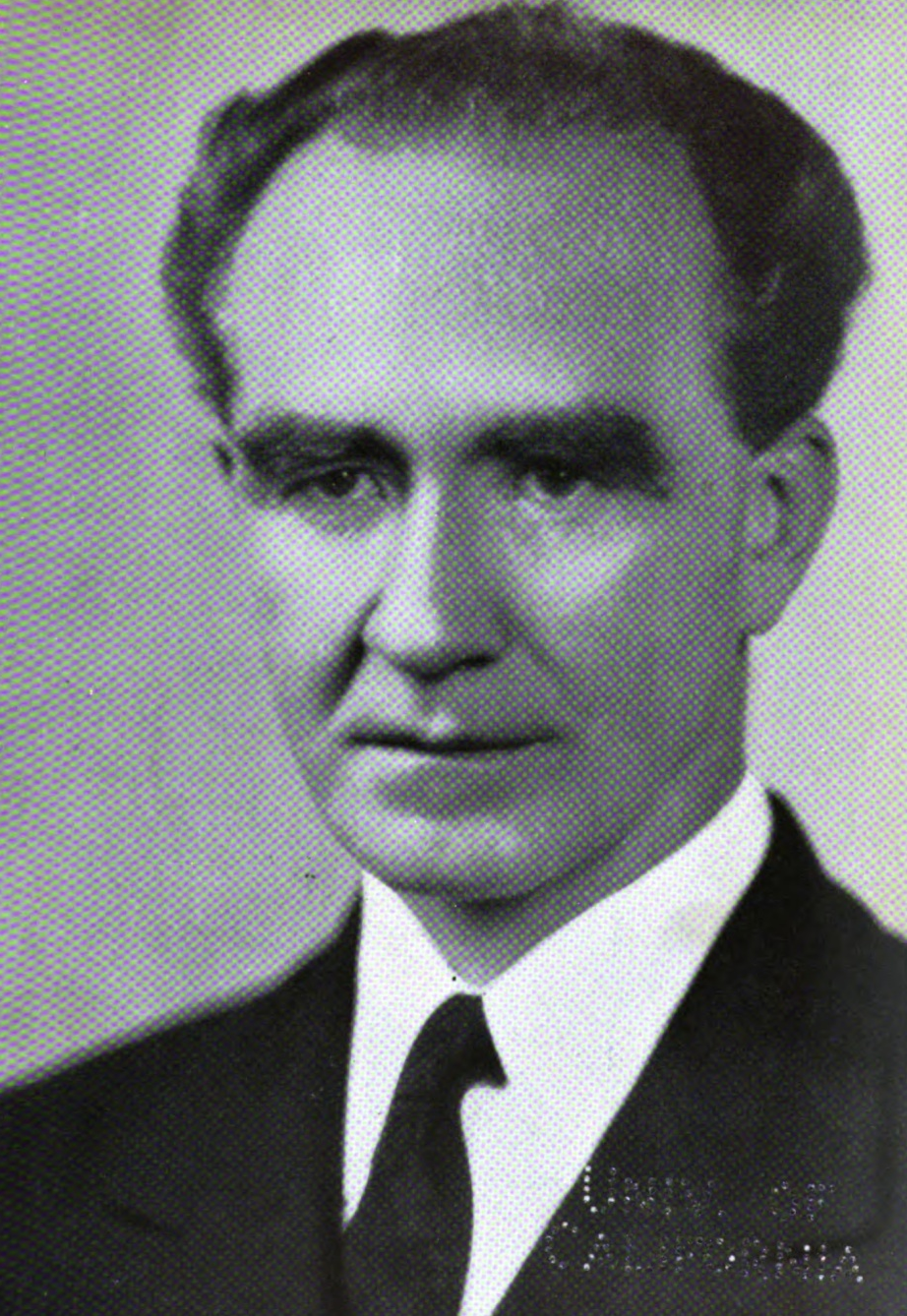
Associate Justice
Frank Murphy
of Michigan

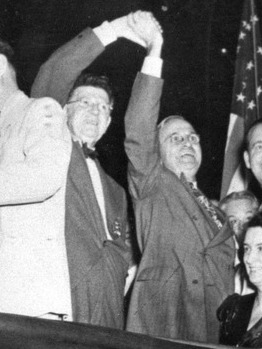
Chicago mayor Edward J. Kelly holds up Truman's arm in a celebratory gesture

Despite the obvious physical decline in the president's appearance, as well as rumors of secret health problems, Roosevelt's fourth nomination as president was largely unchallenged. The contention lay in the vice-presidential nomination. Henry A. Wallace had been elected vice president in 1940. He was FDR's preferred choice and was very popular with rank and file Democratic voters. However, conservative party leaders, such as Southerner James F. Byrnes, strongly opposed his renomination. They regarded Wallace as being too far to the left, too "progressive" and too friendly to labor to be next in line for the presidency. Fighting to keep Wallace off the ticket were outgoing Democratic National Committee chairman Frank C. Walker, incoming chairman Robert E. Hannegan, party treasurer Edwin W. Pauley, strategist Edward J. Flynn, Chicago Mayor Edward Joseph Kelly and lobbyist George E. Allen, who dubbed the group "The Conspiracy of the Pure in Heart." The anti-Wallace forces were divided over who to support. Southern conservatives supported Byrnes, but the Congress of Industrial Organizations opposed him. Flynn opposed Byrnes due to his conversion from Catholicism to Protestantism and lack of appeal to black voters.

They privately told Roosevelt that they would fight Wallace's renomination, and they proposed Missouri Senator Harry S. Truman as FDR's new running mate. Truman had entered the Senate in January 1935 with a reputation as "the senator from Pendergast". Then he had become well known during the war as the chairman of a Senate investigating committee. Roosevelt personally liked Wallace and knew little about Truman, but he reluctantly agreed to accept Truman as his new running mate to preserve party unity.

Roosevelt sent a letter to Samuel D. Jackson in which he stated that he would support Wallace if he was a delegate, but had "no desire to appear to dictate to the convention". Roosevelt sent another letter a few days later stating that he would support having either Truman or William O. Douglas as his running mate. Wallace's supporters attempted to save his nomination under the leadership of U.S. Senator Joseph F. Guffey. Wallace's supporters were made up of Rexford Tugwell, Ellis Arnall, Claude Pepper, Helen Gahagan Douglas, Robert F. Wagner, black leaders opposed to Byrd and Byrnes, and the political action committees of the CIO and United Auto Workers. The Michigan delegation's support for Wallace was maintained by the CIO and UAW.

President Roosevelt was absent from the convention, as he traveled to the South Pacific in order to discuss military strategy with General Douglas MacArthur. This was the last time that a presidential nominee failed to attend a national convention during the 20th century. Even so, many delegates refused to abandon Wallace. In the first ballot, with a pool of 17 candidates vying for 1143.5 votes, Wallace led with 429.5 votes, while Truman got 319.5 votes, but Wallace was short of the majority. The party leaders went to work talking to delegates, cutting deals and applying pressure to persuade them to select Truman. Truman won the second ballot by 1031 votes to 105. The maneuverings over the 1944 vice presidential nomination proved to be historic, as FDR died in April 1945, and Truman, not Wallace, thus became the nation's 33rd president.

Jackson, who had worked feverishly to secure Truman's nomination, later said he wanted his tombstone inscribed with the words "Here lies the man who stopped Henry Wallace from becoming President of the United States."

Vice Presidential Balloting
Candidate	1st	2nd (Before Shifts)	2nd (After Shifts)
Truman	319.5	477.5	1,031
Wallace	429.5	473	105
Bankhead II	98	23.5	0
Lucas	61	58	0
Barkley	49.5	40	6
Broughton	43	30	0
McNutt	31	28	1
O'Mahoney	27	8	0
Cooper	26	26	26
Kerr	23	1	0
O'Conor	18	0	0
Thomas	10	0	0
Douglas	0	1	4
Pepper	3	3	0
Murphy	2	0	0
Rayburn	2	0	0
Timmons	1	0	0
Not Voting	29.5	4	0
Absent	3	3	3

Vice Presidential Balloting / 3rd Day of Convention (July 21, 1944)

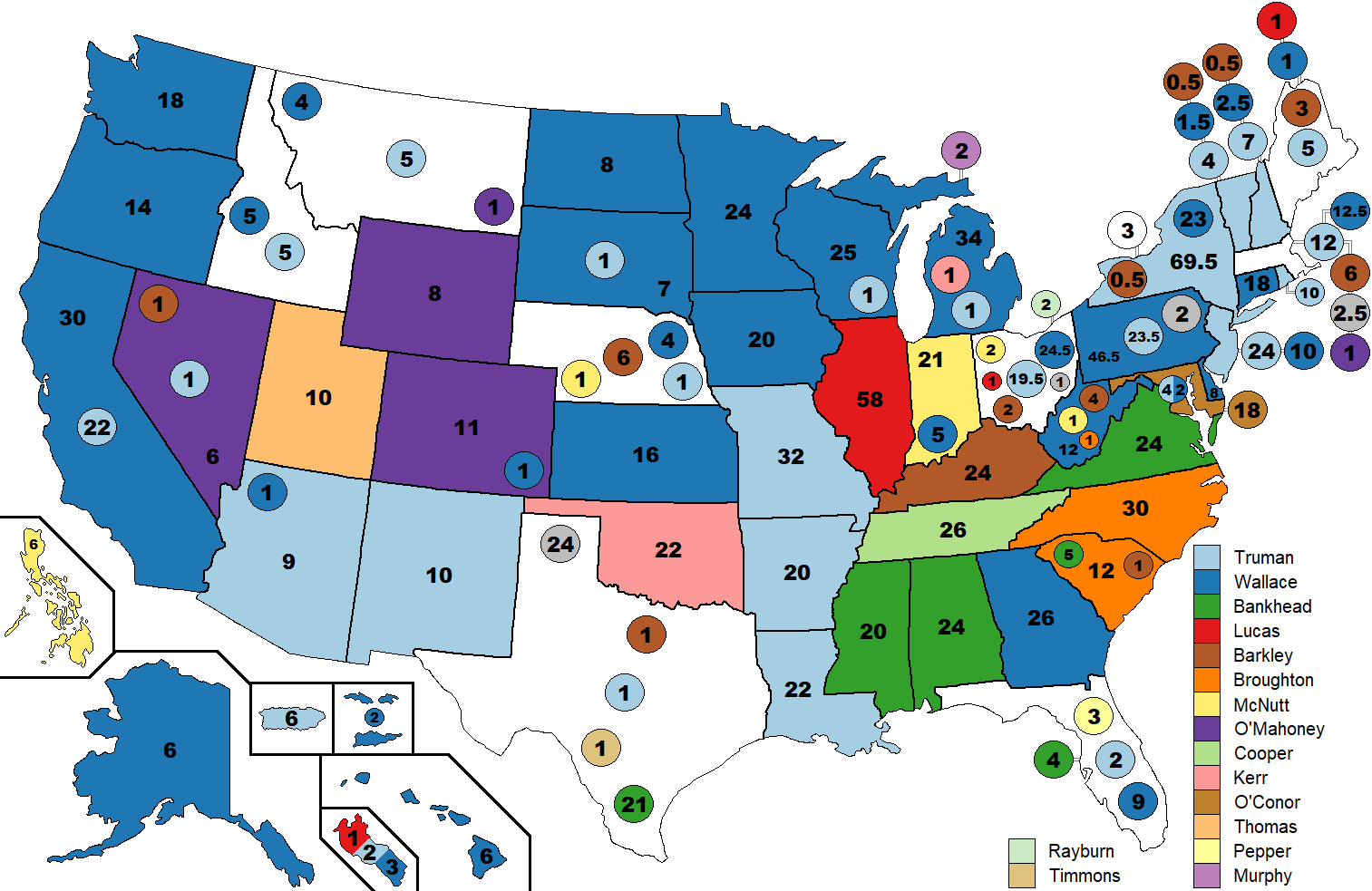
1st Vice Presidential Ballot

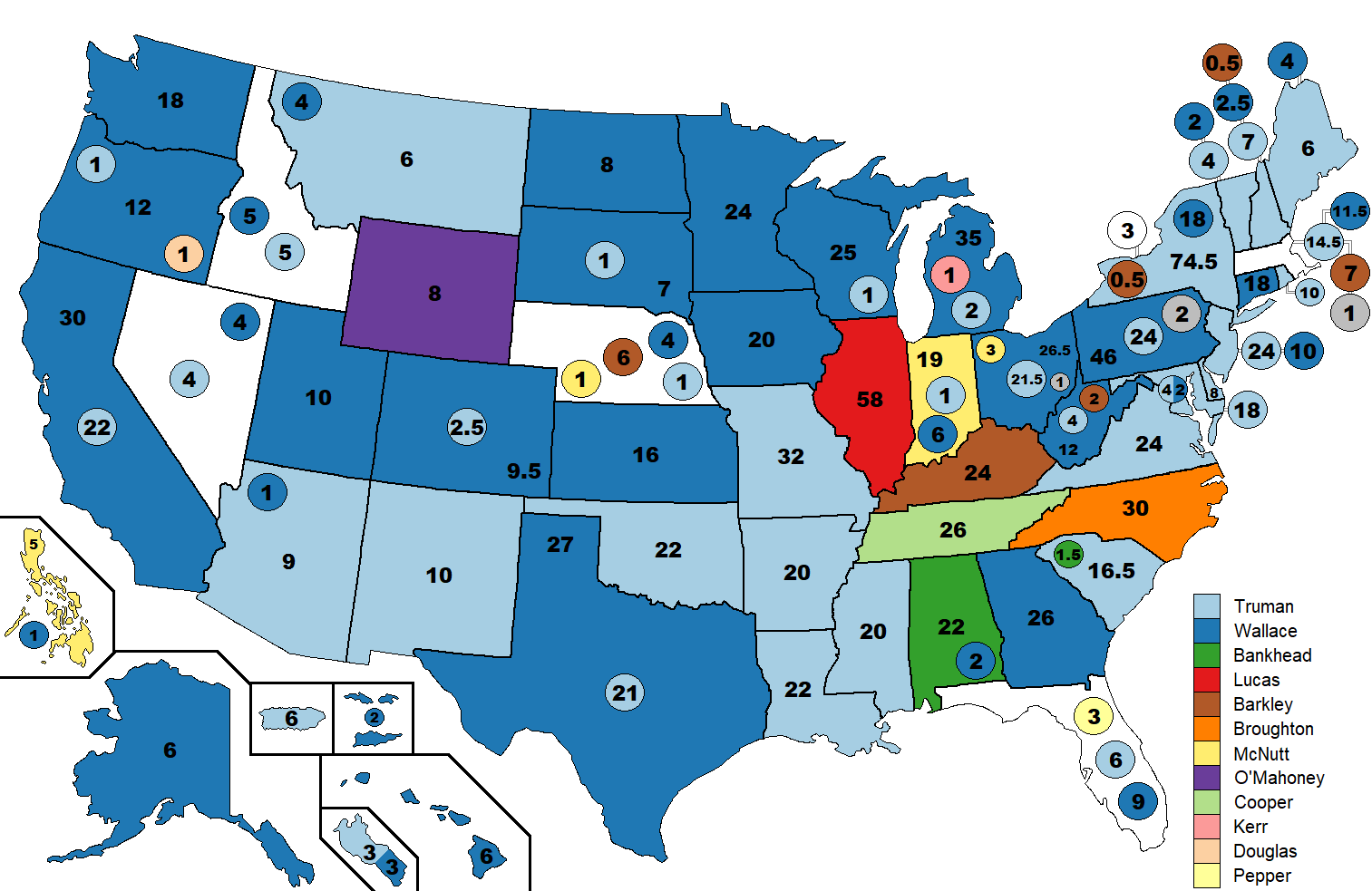
2nd Vice Presidential Ballot (Before Shifts)

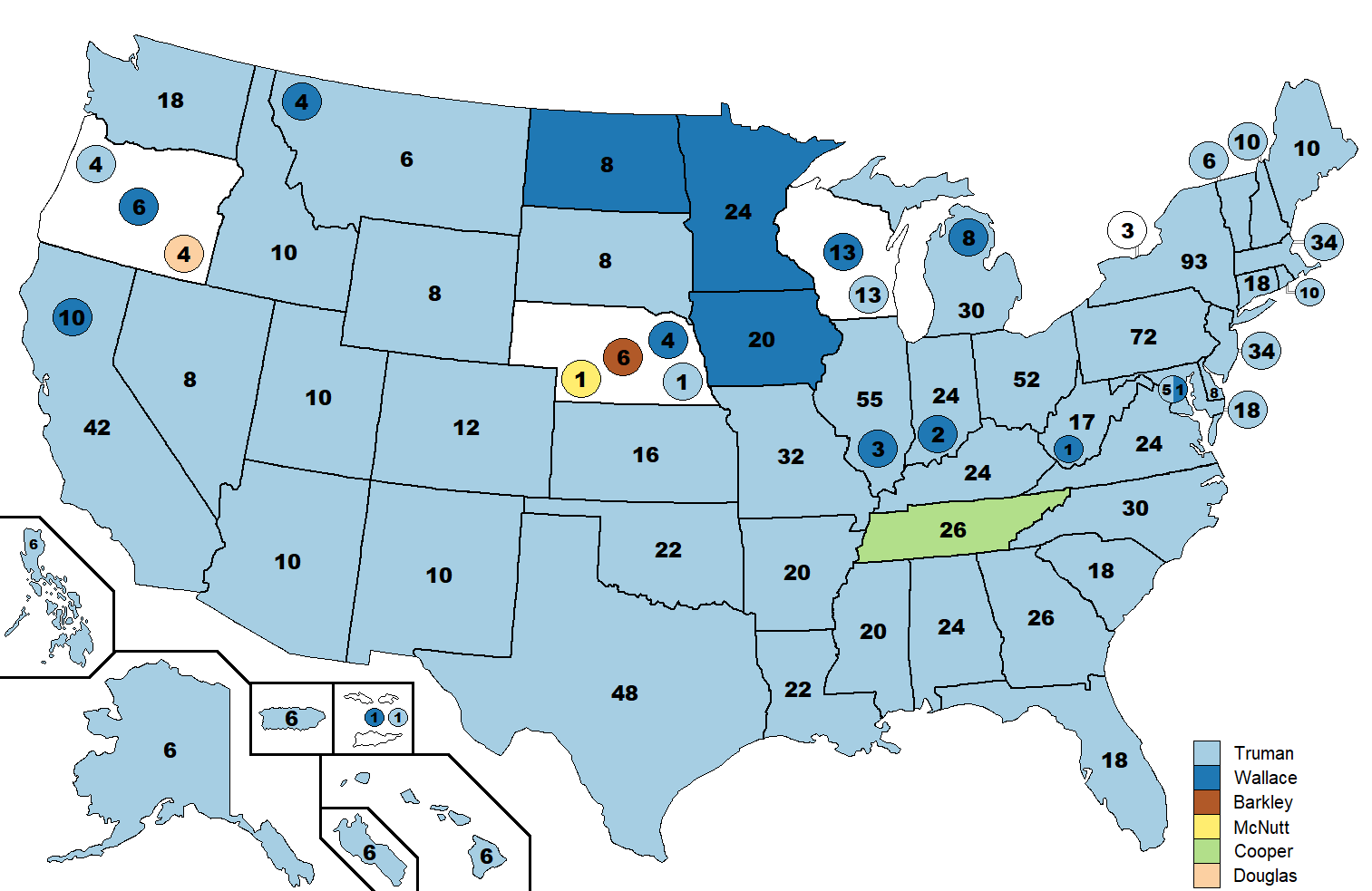
2nd Vice Presidential Ballot (After Shifts)

== In popular culture ==
The events of the Chicago convention were dramatized in the second episode of the popular Showtime documentary series Oliver Stone's Untold History of the United States which looks at how close Henry Wallace came to the US presidency.

== See also ==
- History of the United States Democratic Party
- 1944 Democratic Party presidential primaries
- U.S. presidential nomination convention
- 1944 United States presidential election
- 1944 Republican National Convention

== Works cited ==
- Schmidt, Karl (1960). Henry A. Wallace: Quixotic Crusade 1948. Syracuse University Press. ISBN 978-0-8156-0020-6.

=== Bibliography ===
- Robert H. Ferrell, Choosing Truman: The Democratic Convention of 1944 (1994), Columbia: University of Missouri Press, ISBN 0-8262-1308-1

Preceded by 1940; Chicago, Illinois	Democratic National Conventions	Succeeded by 1948; Philadelphia, Pennsylvania
