= Harry S. Truman: A Life =

1994 book by historian Robert Hugh Ferrell

- Author: Robert H. Ferrell
- Language: English
- Genre: Non-fiction
- Publisher: University of Missouri Press
- Publication date: 1994
- Publication place: United States
- Pages: 501
- ISBN: 978-0-8262-6045-1
- OCLC: 244392057

Harry S. Truman: A Life is a 1994 biography of Harry S. Truman, president of the United States from 1945 to 1953, by historian Robert Hugh Ferrell. Although it was overshadowed by the popular success of David McCullough's Pulitzer-winning biography Truman, Ferrell's book was widely praised by scholars in his field.

== Author ==
Robert H. Ferrell, a professor emeritus at Indiana University, was widely considered the preeminent authority on the history of the Truman administration. A prolific author who produced more than 60 books in his lifetime, Ferrell devoted particular attention to Truman, writing or editing more than a dozen books on his life and presidency, including the 1983 New York Times bestseller Dear Bess: The Letters From Harry to Bess Truman, 1910-1959, 1994's Choosing Truman: The Democratic Convention of 1944 and 2002's The Autobiography of Harry S. Truman. Harry S. Truman: A Life draws on Ferrell's familiarity with Truman's life and work, including extensive research into the manuscripts and oral histories in the Harry S. Truman Presidential Library and Museum in Independence, Missouri.

== Synopsis ==
Ferrell's biography follows the course of Truman's life from his birth in 1884 in Lamar, Missouri to his 1972 death and burial at the Truman Library in Independence. The first five chapters examine his service as a captain in World War I, his pre-politics careers in banking, farming, and a failed run as a haberdasher which ended in bankruptcy, and marriage to Bess Truman in 1919. Chapters six to eight look at his early political career, launched by Kansas City boss Tom Pendergast, beginning with his election as a county judge in 1922, then senator in 1934, and in 1944, vice president to Franklin Roosevelt, in a behind-the-scenes compromise Ferrell calls "the most extraordinary political arrangement of the present century"—Democratic Party leaders could see that the extremely ill Roosevelt was unlikely to survive his fourth term in office, and had to convince him to drop then-VP Henry Wallace in favor of Truman, who was felt to be a more "reliable" man. Truman ascended to the presidency upon Roosevelt's death in 1945, and this period in Truman's life is covered in chapters nine to 17—the majority of the book—including Truman's decision to detonate atomic weapons on Hiroshima and Nagasaki to force an end to World War II, his unexpectedly successful reelection in 1948, his civil-rights initiatives, and his administration's handling of foreign-policy issues, most prominently the Korean War.

== Critical response ==
External videos
- Organization of American Historians panel on Truman biographies, including Robert Ferrell's Harry S. Truman: A Life, Alonzo Hamby's Man of the People: A Life of Harry S. Truman and David McCullough's Truman.", C-SPAN

A review in Publishers Weekly just after its original publication in 1994 called the book "prodigiously researched and engrossing." The majority of the other reviewers were history professors writing in academic journals, and were mostly positive toward the book. Historian Lawrence Kaplan called it "the height of his achievement," with far more detailed analysis than McCullough's book. Augustus Burns, in the Illinois Historical Journal, called the book "one of the best of the lot" of the many works on Truman published in the 1990s, and "indisputable proof that Ferrell has the surest grasp of Truman documents of any current historian." Sean J. Savage, writing in the Register of the Kentucky Historical Society, said that the book "reveals Ferrell's extensive knowledge of the primary sources of the Harry S. Truman Library," offering a rarely seen look at Truman's life as a farmer before WWI and especially "significant and valuable" for his examination of Truman's defense and foreign-policy decisions during the Korean War. Savage was less satisfied with the book's exploration of Truman's civil-rights policies, calling Ferrell's analysis "inadequate" given the wider debate about Truman's views on race. J. Perry Leavell of the North Carolina Historical Review praised Ferrell's "lucid style" and "penetrating insights," and although he felt that the book too often covered material already familiar to historians, it was still a valuable "mid-size alternative" between McCullough's book and Roy Jenkins' 1986 biography Truman. Journal of Southern History reviewer Russell D. Buhite called the book "outstanding" and especially insightful on Truman's foreign-policy decisions, and said that while Ferrell "leaves little doubt that he considers Truman a highly successful president" and a humble, virtuous man, the book is "not hagiographic" and "does not shrink from criticism" of Truman's flaws and mistakes. Wilson D. Miscamble, writing in The Review of Politics, said that the strength of Ferrell's writing was not in "elaborate interpretive pyrotechnics" but a "solid and measured account … in which Ferrell demonstrates a sure grasp of Truman's character and style." Paul Rorvig, in Presidential Studies Quarterly, wrote that Ferrell's book suffered from bad timing in being published after McCullough's Truman, but that Ferrell's comprehensive knowledge of primary sources and his "solid and insightful" writing gave his book "a depth and range that even McCullough has a hard time duplicating." Noting also that Ferrell took a more favorable view of Truman than many previous scholars, Rorvig stated that "Ferrell's favorable assessment of Truman is difficult to dismiss given his thorough knowledge and command of the sources." Taking a more critical tone, James Giglio in The Journal of American History called the book "thoughtful" but felt that it failed to place Truman "into some broader political context" of American history in the way McCullough's book did.
