= Robert Hugh Ferrell =

American historian

- Born: May 8, 1921; Cleveland, Ohio, U.S.
- Died: August 8, 2018 (aged 97); Chelsea, Michigan, U.S.
- Spouse: Lila Sprout Ferrell
- Children: 1
- Awards: John Addison Porter Prize, George Louis Beer Prize

Academic background
- Education: Bowling Green State University (BS); Yale University (MA, PhD)
- Thesis: The United States and the Origins of the Kellogg-Briand Pact (1951)
- Doctoral advisor: Samuel Flagg Bemis

Academic work
- Discipline: American history
- Institutions: Indiana University
- Doctoral students: Eugene P. Trani, Ross Gregory, Melvin Goodman, Arnold A. Offner, John Garry Clifford
- Notable works: Peace in Their Time, Harry S. Truman: A Life, Dear Bess, Choosing Truman, Ill-Advised, The Dying President, Off the Record: The Private Papers of Harry S. Truman

Robert Hugh Ferrell (May 8, 1921 – August 8, 2018) was an American historian. He authored more than 60 books on topics including the U.S. presidency, World War I, and U.S. foreign policy and diplomacy. One of the country's leading historians, Ferrell was widely considered the preeminent authority on the administration of Harry S. Truman, and also wrote books about half a dozen other 20th-century presidents. He was thought by many in the field to be the "dean of American diplomatic historians", a title he disavowed.

== Early life and education ==
Ferrell was born in Cleveland, Ohio, in 1921 to Ernest and Edna Ferrell. His mother was a schoolteacher; his father was a World War I veteran whose career as a banker kept the family moving throughout Ohio during the Great Depression. The family settled in Waterville, Ohio, where Ferrell's father managed the First National Bank and Ferrell and his brother Ernest Jr. went to high school. The Ferrell home was located at 29 N. 4th Street.

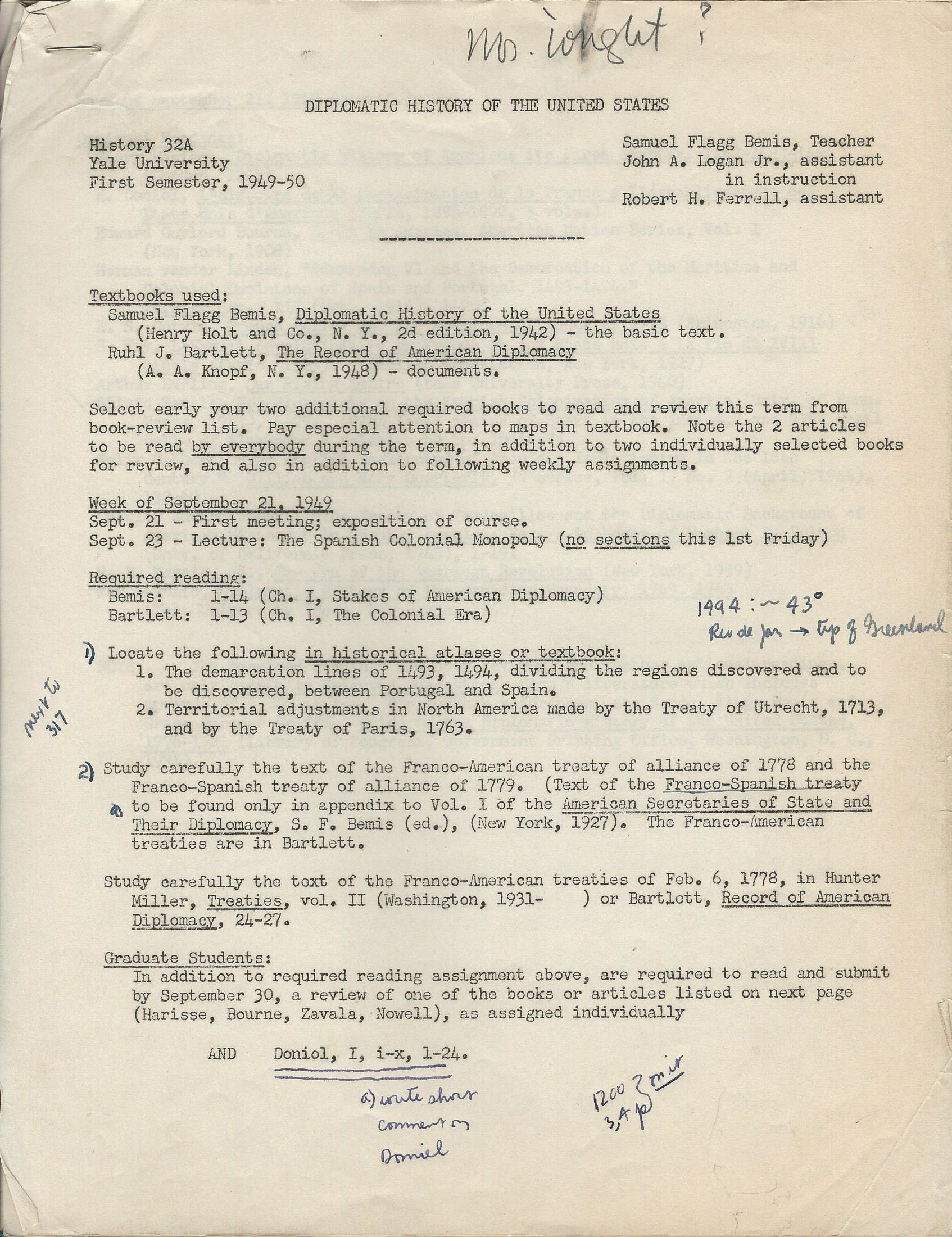
Reading list for a 1949 diplomatic history course given by Bemis, showing Ferrell as an assistant

A pianist, Ferrell studied music and education at Bowling Green State University in Ohio before serving in the U.S. Army Air Forces during the Second World War as a chaplain's assistant and staff sergeant. His wartime experience in Europe compelled him to change his vocation to the study of history, inspired also by reading the works of historian and fellow Ohioan Arthur M. Schlesinger Sr., Ida Tarbell, and Allan Nevins. After the war, he received a B.S. in education from Bowling Green in 1946 and a second bachelor's degree in history in 1947.

At Yale University, Ferrell earned a master's degree in 1948 and a Ph.D. in 1951, working under the direction of Pulitzer Prize-winning historian Samuel Flagg Bemis. A student of the Kellogg–Briand Pact, a 1928 international agreement in which signatory states promised not to use war to resolve their disputes, his dissertation The United States and the Origins of the Kellogg–Briand Pact, won Yale's John Addison Porter Prize for original scholarship.

== Academic career ==
A longer version of the dissertation became his first book, Peace in Their Time: The Origins of the Kellogg-Briand Pact, which went on to win the American Historical Association's 1952 George Louis Beer Prize. "This may not be the last book on the subject, but it should be," wrote historian Richard W. Leopold of Northwestern University.

Ferrell was an intelligence analyst in the U.S. Air Force in Washington, D.C., during the Korean War. After leaving the Air Force, he taught at Michigan State in 1952–53. He then moved to Indiana University Bloomington, where he taught for many years, starting as an assistant professor in 1953 and rising to distinguished professor of history in 1974. He held several notable visiting professorships, including Yale in 1955–56 and the University of Cairo in 1958–59, the universities of South Carolina, Wisconsin and Nebraska in the late 1950s, and the Naval War College in 1974.

In 1971, he was elected the fourth president of the Society for Historians of American Foreign Relations (SHAFR). He made nine appearances on C-SPAN to discuss his books and historical events, and was a featured expert in the History Channel's 2005 documentary series The Presidents. In a 2000 Chicago Sun-Times article, Ferrell ranked Abraham Lincoln, Truman and George Washington as the three best presidents in history.

=== Teaching and academic legacy ===
Ferrell considered teaching a core part of his career, and worked to improve the quality of history teaching in general. In 1964, working with Maurice Glen Baxter and John E. Wiltz, he conducted a thorough survey of every high-school history teacher and school librarian in Indiana, writing up their findings along with detailed suggestions to help unprepared teachers in the 1964 book The Teaching of American History in High Schools.

He supervised 35 Ph.D. students from 1961 to 1988. Many of his students became history professors themselves. His students, both Ph.D. and otherwise, included Eugene P. Trani, former president of Virginia Commonwealth University; American Spectator founder Emmett Tyrrell; William B. Pickett, a professor emeritus of history at the Rose-Hulman Institute of Technology in Indiana and author of Eisenhower Decides To Run; historian and author Arnold A. Offner, past president of SHAFR; Reginald Horsman, University of Wisconsin-Milwaukee professor and author of Race and Manifest Destiny; Terry H. Anderson, history professor at Texas A&M University and author of The Pursuit of Fairness: A History of Affirmative Action; Ross Gregory, history professor at Western Michigan University and author of Walter Hines Page: Ambassador to the Court of St. James’s; national security and intelligence expert Melvin Goodman, author of Whistleblower at the CIA; Theodore A. Wilson, history professor at the University of Kansas and author of The First Summit: Roosevelt and Churchill at Placentia Bay, 1941; and John Garry Clifford, professor of political science at the University of Connecticut.

After his 1988 retirement, SHAFR named the annual Robert H. Ferrell Book Prize in his honor for distinguished scholarship in the field. More than a dozen of his former students, all historians in their own right, compiled the book Presidents, Diplomats, and Other Mortals: Essays Honoring Robert H. Ferrell to recognize his achievements in the field.

== Published works ==
Ferrell wrote prolifically, sharing with Bemis a disapproval of what they called "one-book men" who stopped writing after finishing a Ph.D. dissertation. He published 25 books before his 1988 retirement from teaching, and before his death had produced more than 60. His prose was "expressed with grace and economy, [and] a light wit," wrote historian Lawrence Kaplan. After the publication of Peace in Their Time, his early works included influential history textbooks American Diplomacy in the Great Depression and American Diplomacy: A History, the latter of which was republished in expanded and revised editions three times in the ensuing decades. He continued to work closely with his mentor Bemis, co-editing the later volumes of the series American Secretaries of State and Their Diplomacy which Bemis had begun in the 1920s, and also writing the entries on Frank B. Kellogg, Henry L. Stimson, and George Marshall. He helped edit Bemis' Pulitzer-winning 1949 biography, John Quincy Adams and the Foundations of American Foreign Policy, and catalyzed the publication of a 1957 paperback edition of Bemis' The Diplomacy of the American Revolution.

Ferrell was also notable for the thoroughness and depth of his research, with a knack for finding obscure or unpublished diaries, memoirs, and letters which would then become central elements of his books, such as the papers of Coolidge-era assistant secretary of state William Castle, which greatly informed Peace in Their Time. Editing and publishing the diaries and private letters of persons of historical interest, from presidents to ordinary soldiers, became a specialty of his, with nearly two dozen such books to his name, including presidents Truman, Warren G. Harding, Calvin Coolidge (and his wife Grace) and Dwight Eisenhower, White House staffers James Hagerty, Frank Comerford Walker, Arthur F. Burns and Eben Ayers, and soldiers in the American Civil War, World Wars I and II, the Spanish–American War, and the Mexican–American War.

Not content to be a passive chronicler of history, Ferrell would often, when he felt a topic merited it, engage in spirited critique of other historians' interpretations of past events. In the influential 1955 article "Pearl Harbor and the Revisionists," he argued against the conspiracy theory that Franklin Roosevelt had deliberately allowed Japan to commit the surprise attack that drew the U.S. into World War II. His book Harry S. Truman and the Cold War Revisionists argued against post-1960s New Left historians' critiques of the Truman era. Reactions to the book were divided: Writing for Michigan State University's H-Net, Curt Cardwell felt that Ferrell misunderstood the arguments of the younger generation he criticized and was "condescending," while Alonzo L. Hamby's review in Journal of Cold War Studies called the book "restrained and gentlemanly" and noted that Ferrell viewed prominent revisionist William Appleman Williams as a friend. In a 1995 article in American Heritage, he accused Merle Miller, author of the bestselling book Plain Speaking: An Oral Biography of Harry. S. Truman, of fabricating many of the quotes attributed to Truman. In 1998's The Dying President, Ferrell examined Franklin D. Roosevelt's medical records and concluded that Roosevelt had deliberately chosen to keep the cardiovascular disease which would soon kill him secret from the public. The book was praised by historian John Lukacs as “painstaking and exceptionally researched … sparklingly well-written, bearing the marks of a master historian” and one of the most important books on Roosevelt by any historian.

=== Harry S. Truman ===
Ferrell wrote voluminously on Truman, devoting more than a dozen books to his life and presidency. Ferrell's work rehabilitated the reputation of the Truman presidency, which had been previously considered a failure by scholars, by providing evidence of how decisions such as Truman's choice to champion the Marshall Plan led to the successful establishment of an American-led post-war world order. Although it was overshadowed by the popular success of David McCullough's Pulitzer-winning Truman biography, Ferrell's 1994 Harry S. Truman: A Life was considered a masterwork by scholars in his field. Historian Lawrence Kaplan called it "the height of his achievement," with far more detailed analysis than McCullough's book.

Ferrell's discovery of a cache of hundreds of letters from Truman to his wife, previously thought to have been burned, led to his 1983 book Dear Bess: The Letters From Harry to Bess Truman, 1910–1959, a New York Times bestseller.

Coincidentally, Ferrell and Truman were born on the same day, May 8.

=== World War I ===
World War I was a special interest of Ferrell's—in particular the 1918 Meuse-Argonne Offensive, the largest and bloodiest U.S. operation of the war, in which Ferrell's father and then-Capt. Harry Truman both served. His books on the conflict include America's Deadliest Battle, Collapse at Meuse-Argonne, and a profile of the American Expeditionary Forces' only African-American division (the 92nd Infantry Division), Unjustly Dishonored, as well as several edited memoirs of soldiers who served in it. One of his final books, 2008's The Question of MacArthur's Reputation, painstakingly reconstructed the events of the Meuse-Argonne, a victory which helped launch the career of Gen. Douglas MacArthur, to prove that MacArthur had lied about his role in the battle to embellish his prestige and take undeserved credit, which has since been proved as mostly baseless.

== Awards ==
In addition to the John Addison Porter Prize and George Louis Beer Prize for his early work on the Kellogg-Briand Pact, Ferrell received the Society for Historians of American Foreign Relations' Norman and Laura Graebner Award in 1998, which recognizes distinguished lifetime achievement by a senior historian of United States foreign relations. In 2002, Ferrell was given the Society for Military History's Distinguished Book Award for editing a trio of memoirs by soldier William S. Triplet, A Youth in the Meuse-Argonne, A Colonel in the Armored Divisions, and In the Philippines and Okinawa.

== Personal life and death ==
His wife, Lila, died in 2002. They had a daughter, Carolyn. He was an inveterate collector of books, owning more than 10,000 volumes.

He died of heart disease in Chelsea, Michigan at age 97.

Ferrell's papers, writings and correspondence, comprising 200,000 items, are archived at Indiana University's Lilly Library.

== Bibliography ==
External videos
- Booknotes interview with Ferrell on The Strange Deaths of President Harding, January 12, 1997, C-SPAN
- Presentation by Ferrell on Five Days in October: The Lost Battalion, May 14, 2005, C-SPAN
- Lecture by Ferrell: Illness and Death of President F. Roosevelt, Oct. 30, 1996, C-SPAN
- Lecture by Ferrell: Chief Justice John Jay's Legacy, Dec. 12, 1995, C-SPAN
- Ashbrook Colloquium presentation by Ferrell: Good Fortune in Politics: The Case of Calvin Coolidge, Jan. 28, 2005
- Organization of American Historians panel on Truman biographies, including Robert Ferrell's Harry S. Truman: A Life, Alonzo Hamby's Man of the People: A Life of Harry S. Truman and David McCullough's Truman.", C-SPAN

=== As primary author ===
- Peace in Their Time: The Origins of the Kellogg-Briand Pact (1952)^{[Subject matter: The Kellogg-Briand Pact]}
- "Pearl Harbor and the Revisionists" in The Historian (Spring 1955)
- "The Mukden Incident: September 18–19, 1931" in Journal of Modern History (March 1955)
- American Diplomacy in the Great Depression: Hoover-Stimson Foreign Policy, 1929–1933 (1957)
- American Diplomacy: A History (1959, with updated editions in 1969, 1975, and 1987)
- The American Secretaries of State and Their Diplomacy (edited volumes 11-19, 1958–1980); wrote Vol. 11, Frank B. Kellogg and Henry L. Stimson (1963)^{[Subject matter: Frank B. Kellogg, Henry L. Stimson]} and Vol. 15, George C. Marshall
- Maurice Glen Baxter, Robert H. Ferrell, and John E. Wiltz, The Teaching of American History in High Schools (1964)
- Richard B. Morris, William Greenleaf and Robert H. Ferrell, America: A History of the People (1971)
- Samuel F. Wells, Jr., Robert H. Ferrell, and David F. Trask, The Ordeal of World Power: American Diplomacy Since 1900 (1975)
- Harry S. Truman and the Modern American Presidency (1983)
- Truman: A Centenary Remembrance, 1884–1972 (1984)
- Woodrow Wilson and World War I, 1917–1921 (New American Nation Series, 1985)
- "Truman's Place in History" in Reviews in American History (March 1990)
- Harry S. Truman: His Life On the Family Farms (1991)
- Ill-Advised: Presidential Health and Public Trust (1992)
- Choosing Truman: The Democratic Convention of 1944 (1994)^{[Subject matter: 1944 Democratic National Convention]}
- Harry S. Truman: A Life (1994)
- Francis H. Heller and Robert H. Ferrell, "Plain Faking?" in American Heritage (May–June 1995)
- The Strange Deaths of President Harding (1996)
- Atlas of American History (1996, with Richard Natkiel)
- The Dying President: Franklin D. Roosevelt, 1944–1945 (1998)
- The Presidency of Calvin Coolidge (1998)
- Truman and Pendergast (1999)
- Harry S. Truman (American Presidents Reference Series, 2002)
- Collapse at Meuse-Argonne: The Failure of the Missouri-Kansas Division (2004)
- "A Tale of Two Archives" in Topic: The Washington & Jefferson College Review, vol. 54, "A Festschrift for Professor Walter S. Sanderlin" (2004)
- Five Days in October: The Lost Battalion of World War I (2005)^{[Subject matter: Lost Battalion (World War I)]}
- Good Fortune in Politics: The Case of Calvin Coolidge (Ashbrook Colloquium, 2005)
- Harry S. Truman and the Cold War Revisionists (2006)
- Presidential Leadership: From Woodrow Wilson to Harry S. Truman (2006)
- "Immigration and the Red Scare" in Who Belongs in America?: Presidents, Rhetoric, and Immigration (2006)
- America's Deadliest Battle: Meuse-Argonne, 1918 (2007)
- The Question of MacArthur's Reputation: Côte de Châtillon, October 14–16, 1918 (2008)
- Grace Coolidge: The People's Lady in Silent Cal's White House (2008)
- Unjustly Dishonored: An African American Division in World War I (2011)

=== As editor ===
- Conference of Scholars on the European Recovery Program, March 20–21, 1964, at the Harry S. Truman Library (Transcript of discussion led by Robert H. Ferrell, 1964)
- Calvin Coolidge, The Talkative President: The Off-the-Record Press Conferences of Calvin Coolidge (1964)
- Foundations of American Diplomacy, 1775–1872 (1968)
- America As a World Power: 1872–1945 (1971)
- America In a Divided World, 1945–1972 (1975)
- Harry S. Truman, Off the Record: The Private Papers of Harry S. Truman (1980)
- Dwight D. Eisenhower, The Eisenhower Diaries (1981)
- Harry S. Truman, Dear Bess: The Letters From Harry to Bess Truman, 1910–1959 (1983)
- James Hagerty, The Diary of James C. Hagerty: Eisenhower in Mid-Course, 1954–1955 (1983)
- Joseph Douglas Lawrence, Fighting Soldier: The AEF in 1918 (1985)
- Curtis V. Hard, Banners In the Air: The Eighth Ohio Volunteers and the Spanish–American War (1988)
- Napoleon Jackson Tecumseh Dana, Monterrey Is Ours!: The Mexican War Letters of Lieutenant Dana, 1845-1847 (1990)
- Truman in the White House: The Diary of Eben A. Ayers (1991)
- Grace Coolidge, Grace Coolidge: An Autobiography (1992)
- Flavel C. Barber, Holding the Line: The Third Tennessee Infantry, 1861–1864 (1994)
- The Twentieth Century: An Almanac (1995)
- Harry S. Truman and the Bomb: A Documentary History (1996)
- Frank C. Walker, FDR's Quiet Confidant: The Autobiography of Frank C. Walker (1997)
- Rudolph H. Hartmann, The Kansas City Investigation: Pendergast's Downfall, 1938–1939 (1999)
- William S. Triplet, A Youth in the Meuse-Argonne: A Memoir, 1917–1918 (2000)
- William S. Triplet, A Colonel in the Armored Divisions: A Memoir, 1941–1945 (2001)
- William S. Triplet, In the Philippines and Okinawa: A Memoir, 1945–1948 (2001)
- The Autobiography of Harry S. Truman (2002)
- Elmer W. Sherwood, A Soldier in World War I: The Diary of Elmer W. Sherwood (2004)
- Hugh S. Thompson, Trench Knives and Mustard Gas: With the 42nd Rainbow Division in France (C. A. Brannen Series, No. 6) (2004)
- William M. Wright, Meuse-Argonne Diary: A Division Commander in World War I (2004)
- Horace Leonard Baker, Argonne Days in World War I (2007)
- Pierpont L. Stackpole, In the Company of Generals: The World War I Diary of Pierpont L. Stackpole (2009)
- Arthur F. Burns, Inside the Nixon Administration: The Secret Diary of Arthur Burns, 1969–1974 (2010)
- Conrad S. Babcock, Reminiscences of Conrad S. Babcock: The Old U.S. Army and the New, 1898–1918 (2012)
