= University of Missouri Press =

American university press

- Parent company: University of Missouri
- Founded: 1958
- Founder: William Peden
- Country of origin: United States
- Headquarters location: Columbia, Missouri
- Distribution: Chicago Distribution Center (US); Scholarly Book Services (Canada); East-West Export Books (Asia, the Pacific); The Eurospan Group (Europe)
- Publication types: Books
- Official website: press.umsystem.edu

The University of Missouri Press is a university press operated by the University of Missouri in Columbia, Missouri and London, England; it was founded in 1958 primarily through the efforts of English professor William Peden. Many publications are by, for, and about Missourians. The press also emphasizes the areas of American and world history; military history; intellectual history; biography; journalism; African American studies; women's studies; American, British, and Latin American literary criticism; political science; regional studies; and creative nonfiction. The press has published 2,000 books and publishes about 30 mostly academic books a year.

== Notable publications ==
Among its notable publications were:

- Collected works of Langston Hughes
- Collected works of Eric Voegelin
- Robert H. Ferrell's Give 'em Hell, Harry series about Harry Truman

== Series ==
- Studies in Constitutional Democracies, edited by Jeffrey L. Pasley and Jay K. Dow
- Journalism in Perspective: Continuity and Disruptions, edited by Tim P. Vos and Yong Z. Volz
- The American Military Experience Series, edited by John C. McManus.
- The Collected Works of Langston Hughes
- The Collected Works of Eric Voegelin
- The Eric Voegelin Institute Series in Political Philosophy
- The Give 'Em Hell Harry Series, edited by Robert H. Ferrell.
- The Mark Twain and His Circle Series, edited by Tom Quirk.
- The Missouri Biography Series, edited by William E. Foley.
- The Missouri Heritage Readers Series, edited by Rebecca B. Schroeder.
- The Shades of Blue and Gray Series, edited by Herman Hattaway, Jon Wakelyn, and Clayton E. Jewett.
- The Sports and American Culture Series, edited by Roger Launius.
- The Southern Women Series, edited by Theda Perdue, Betty Brandon, and Virginia Bernhard.
- The Paul Anthony Brick Lectures, which include works by John Hope Franklin and Sissela Bok.

== Reorganization ==
The university proposed in spring 2012 to close the press and terminate its ten employees in order to end the university's subsidy to the press, estimated by the university administration as $400,000 per year and by outside critics of the closure decision as under $250,000 a year. The decision was reversed in August 2012 after public outcry. As part of the reorganization the press now reports up to the main Columbia campus rather than the University of Missouri System. A new director was hired in 2013.

== See also ==
- List of English-language book publishing companies
- List of university presses
