= Dear Bess =

1983 book of Harry S. Truman writings, edited by historian Robert Hugh Ferrell

Dear Bess: The Letters from Harry to Bess Truman, 1910-1959
- Author: Harry S. Truman, Bess Truman, Robert H. Ferrell
- Genre: Non-fiction
- Publisher: Norton
- Publication date: 1983
- Publication place: United States
- Pages: 593
- ISBN: 978-0-8262-1203-0
- OCLC: 9440945
- Dewey Decimal: 973.9180922
- LC Class: E814 .A4

Dear Bess: The Letters from Harry to Bess Truman, 1910-1959 is a 1983 book edited by historian Robert Hugh Ferrell collecting more than 500 letters from U.S. president Harry S. Truman to his wife Bess, ranging from the couple's early courtship to his post-presidency retirement. Well-regarded by other historians, the book also achieved popular success, becoming a New York Times bestseller.

== Author ==
Ferrell, a professor emeritus at Indiana University, was widely considered the preeminent authority on the history of the Truman administration. A prolific author who produced more than 60 books in his lifetime, Ferrell devoted particular attention to Truman, writing or editing more than a dozen books on his life and presidency, including the 1994 biography Harry S. Truman: A Life and 2002's The Autobiography of Harry S. Truman.

== Background ==
After Bess Truman's death in 1982, her personal archives were donated to the Harry S. Truman Presidential Library and Museum in Independence, Missouri. While surveying the contents of the archives a year later, Ferrell discovered more than 1,200 letters from Harry to his wife, all of which had been previously thought to have been burned by Bess to preserve their privacy. The letters were not well organized or well preserved by Bess Truman; Ferrell states that they were found haphazardly in the Truman house "under sofa cushions, in closets, in books, and in the attic where both pigeons and raccoons had gotten in (the latter, having eaten the pigeons, then discovered jars of jam, which they opened, smearing letters with both feathers and jam)." The letters included what was then the only known writing by Harry Truman from his time before becoming president, as well as newly discovered documents from his presidency such as a seven-page memo on the 1950 firing of defense secretary Louis A. Johnson. Ferrell recognized the unique nature of the cache of letters immediately and moved quickly to compile them into a book; Dear Bess was published only four months later.

== Contents ==
The published letters, comprising about half of the total archive and edited for clarity, are divided chronologically into sections including Truman's time as a farmer, soldier, local politician, and eventually president. All but one were originally handwritten. Since the letters were originally intended to be private, Truman was more candid and unguarded in his choice of words than he might otherwise have been; reviewer Bob McKelvey of the Detroit Free Press wrote that "the warts in Truman's character as well as the beauty spots are there for all to see." The subject matter of the letters included Truman's thoughts on the many political issues and events he dealt with in his work, but also a considerable number of love letters to Bess, leading one reviewer to complain that "even such genuine affection grows numbing when reiterated more than 600 times." Truman himself joked self-deprecatingly about his effusiveness, writing to Bess that "you really didn't know I had so much softness and sentimentality in me, did you?"

== Critical response ==
The book was well received by both mainstream and academic critics. A review in People magazine said that "Truman was no literary genius, but his letters to his wife are delightfully cheerful and outspoken" and that "it is the simplicity and honesty of the letters themselves that make this book valuable." Cynthia Durcanin of The Christian Science Monitor wrote that Truman's letters "capture a sense of Americana not found in history books." McKelvey stated that while the book was revealing about Truman's life in politics, the "central theme of Dear Bess is Truman's private life and his adoration of Bess Truman." Matt Schudel of The Washington Post said that Truman was remarkably "frank about his own shortcomings" in his writings, and that the private nature of the correspondence also let Truman express his otherwise unspoken opinions about other politicians and "sometimes retrograde" thoughts about issues such as race. The New York Times reviewer Geoffrey C. Ward felt that the book contained "no startling revelations" about Truman, instead confirming the popular opinion of Truman as a plainspoken, hard-working man who "retained the petty bigotry bred into his bones" as a child but also strove to do the right thing on civil-rights issues such as the integration of the armed forces. He noted that Bess Truman, "perhaps the most private and least known of all the modern First Ladies," remained an enigma since none of her replies to her husband were found in the collection, but that her influence on Harry's future success was obvious and that "without her, it now seems clear, Harry S. Truman might have stayed a dirt farmer all his life."
