= Presidential Studies Quarterly =

- Discipline: Political science
- Language: English
- Edited by: Douglas L. Kriner

Publication details
- Former name: Center House Bulletin
- History: 1971–present
- Publisher: Wiley-Blackwell on behalf of the Center for the Study of the Presidency and Congress (United States)
- Frequency: Quarterly
- Impact factor: 0.908 (2017)

Standard abbreviations
- ISO 4: Pres. Stud. Q.

Indexing
- ISSN: 0360-4918 (print); 1741-5705 (web)
- LCCN: 75646123
- OCLC no.: 1081438187

Links
- Journal homepage; Online access; Online archive

Presidential Studies Quarterly is a quarterly peer-reviewed political science journal dedicated to the scholarly study of the presidency of the United States. It was established in 1971 as Center House Bulletin, obtaining its current name in 1974. It is published by Wiley-Blackwell on behalf of the Center for the Study of the Presidency and Congress. The editor-in-chief is Professor Douglas L. Kriner (Cornell University). According to the Journal Citation Reports, the journal has a 2023 impact factor of 1.1, ranking it 176th out of 318 journals in the category "Political Science".
