= Bibliography of Dwight D. Eisenhower =

This bibliography of Dwight D. Eisenhower is a list of published works about Dwight D. Eisenhower, the 34th president of the United States.

== General biographies ==
- Ambrose, Stephen (1983). Eisenhower: Soldier, General of the Army, President-Elect (1890–1952). Vol. I. New York: Simon & Schuster.
- Ambrose, Stephen (1984). Eisenhower: The President (1952–1969). Vol. II. New York: Simon & Schuster.
- Boyle, Peter G. (2005). Eisenhower. Pearson/Longman. ISBN 0-582-28720-0. OCLC 55665502.
- D'Este, Carlo (2002). Eisenhower: A Soldier's Life. ISBN 0-8050-5686-6.
- Galambos, Louis (2018). Eisenhower becoming the leader of the free world. ISBN 978-1-4214-2504-7.
- Krieg, Joann P. ed. (1987). Dwight D. Eisenhower, Soldier, President, Statesman. 24 essays by scholars. ISBN 0-313-25955-0
- Newton, Jim (2011). Eisenhower: The White House Years. Doubleday. ISBN 978-0-385-52353-0.
- Parmet, Herbert S. (1972). Eisenhower and the American Crusades. OCLC 482017.
- Smith, Jean Edward (2012). Eisenhower in War and Peace. Random House. ISBN 978-1-4000-6693-3.
- Wicker, Tom (2002). Dwight D. Eisenhower. Times Books. ISBN 0-8050-6907-0. OCLC 49893871.

== Military career ==
- Ambrose, Stephen E. (1970) The Supreme Commander: The War Years of Dwight D. Eisenhower excerpt and text search
- Ambrose, Stephen E. (1998). The Victors: Eisenhower and his Boys: The Men of World War II, New York : Simon & Schuster. ISBN 0-684-85628-X
- Eisenhower, David (1986). Eisenhower at War 1943–1945, New York : Random House. ISBN 0-394-41237-0. A detailed study by his grandson.
- Eisenhower, John S. D. (2003). General Ike, Free Press, New York. ISBN 0-7432-4474-5
- Hobbs, Joseph Patrick (1999). Dear General: Eisenhower's Wartime Letters to Marshall. Baltimore: Johns Hopkins University Press. ISBN 0-8018-6219-1.
- Irish, Kerry E. "Apt Pupil: Dwight Eisenhower and the 1930 Industrial Mobilization Plan", The Journal of Military History 70.1 (2006) 31–61 online in Project Muse.
- Jordan, Jonathan W. (2011). Brothers Rivals Victors: Eisenhower, Patton, Bradley, and the Partnership that Drove the Allied Conquest in Europe. NAL/Caliber. ISBN 978-0-451-23212-0. OCLC 617565184.
- Jordan, Jonathan W. (2015). American Warlords: How Roosevelt's High Command Led America to Victory in World War II. NAL/Caliber. ISBN 978-0-451-41457-1. OCLC 892458610.
- Pogue, Forrest C. (1954). The Supreme Command. Office of the Chief of Military History, Dept. of the Army. OCLC 1247005.
- Weigley, Russell (1981). Eisenhower's Lieutenants: the Campaign of France and Germany, 1944–1945. Indiana University Press. ISBN 0-253-13333-5. OCLC 6863111.
- Wukovits, John F. (2006). Eisenhower. New York: Palgrave Macmillan. ISBN 978-0-230-61394-2.

== Civilian career ==
- Borhi, László. "Rollback, Liberation, Containment, or Inaction? U.S. Policy and Eastern Europe in the 1950s." Journal of Cold War Studies 1.3 (1999): 67-110. online
- Bowie, Robert R. and Immerman, Richard H. (1998). Waging Peace: How Eisenhower Shaped an Enduring Cold War Strategy, Oxford University Press. ISBN 0-19-506264-7
- Chernus, Ira (2008). Apocalypse Management: Eisenhower and the Discourse of National Insecurity, Stanford University Press. ISBN 978-0-8047-5807-9 OCLC 105454244
- Damms, Richard V. (2002). The Eisenhower Presidency, 1953–1961
- David Paul T., ed. (1954). Presidential Nominating Politics in 1952. 5 vols., Johns Hopkins Press. OCLC 519846
- Divine, Robert A. (1981). Eisenhower and the Cold War.
- Galambos, Louis. Eisenhower: Becoming the Leader of the Free World (Johns Hopkins University Press, 2020).
- Gellman, Irwin F. (2015). The President and the Apprentice: Eisenhower and Nixon, 1952–1961. New Haven, CT: Yale University Press. ISBN 978-0-300-18105-0 OCLC 910504324
- Graff, Henry F., ed. The Presidents: A Reference History (3rd ed. 2002)
- Greenstein, Fred I. (1991). The Hidden-Hand Presidency: Eisenhower as Leader. Basic Books. ISBN 0-465-02948-5 OCLC 8765635
- Harris, Douglas B. "Dwight Eisenhower and the New Deal: The Politics of Preemption", Presidential Studies Quarterly, Vol. 27, 1997.
- Harris, Seymour E. (1962). The Economics of the Political Parties, with Special Attention to Presidents Eisenhower and Kennedy. OCLC 174566
- Heller, Francis H. "The Eisenhower White House." Presidential Studies Quarterly 23.3 (1993): 509-517 online.
- Hitchcock, William I. (2018). The Age of Eisenhower: America and the World in the 1950s. Simon & Schuster. ISBN 978-1-439-17566-8.
- Jacobs, Travis Beal (2001). Eisenhower at Columbia. Piscataway, New Jersey: Transaction Publishers. ISBN 0-7658-0036-5.
- Kabaservice, Geoffrey. Rule and ruin: The downfall of moderation and the destruction of the Republican Party, from Eisenhower to the Tea Party (Oxford UP, 2012).
- Kahn, Michael A. "Shattering the myth about President Eisenhower's Supreme Court appointments." Presidential Studies Quarterly 22.1 (1992): 47-56 online.
- Kingseed, Cole Christian. Eisenhower and the Suez Crisis of 1956 (1995)
- King, James D., and James W. Riddlesperger Jr., "Presidential leadership of congressional civil rights voting: the cases of Eisenhower and Johnson." Policy Studies Journal 21.3 (1993): 544-555.
- Krieg, Joann P. ed. Dwight D. Eisenhower, Soldier, President, Statesman (1987). 24 essays by scholars.
- Launius, Roger D. "Eisenhower, Sputnik, and the Creation of NASA." Prologue-Quarterly of the National Archives 28.2 (1996): 127-143.
- Lasby, Clarence G. Eisenhower's Heart Attack: How Ike Beat Heart Disease and Held on to the Presidency (1997)
- Mason, Robert. "War Hero in the White House: Dwight Eisenhower and the Politics of Peace, Prosperity, and Party." in Profiles in Power (Brill, 2020) pp. 112-128.
- Mayer, Michael S. (2009). The Eisenhower Years Facts on File. ISBN 0-8160-5387-1
- Medhurst, Martin J. (1993). Dwight D. Eisenhower: Strategic Communicator. Westport, CT: Greenwood Press. ISBN 0-313-26140-7 OCLC 26764309
- Newton, Jim. (2011) Eisenhower: The White House Years ISBN 978-0-385-52353-0 OCLC 694394274
- Nichols, David A. Eisenhower 1956: The President's Year of Crisis--Suez and the Brink of War (2012).
- Nichols, David A. A matter of justice: Eisenhower and the beginning of the civil rights revolution (Simon and Schuster, 2007).
- Pach, Chester J., and Richardson, Elmo (1991). Presidency of Dwight D. Eisenhower. University Press of Kansas. ISBN 0-7006-0436-7 OCLC 22307949
- Parry, Pam (2014). Eisenhower: The Public Relations President. Lanham, Maryland: Lexington Books. p. 75. ISBN 978-0-7391-8930-6.
- Rutland, Robert A. "President Eisenhower and His Press Secretary." Journalism Quarterly 34.4 (1957): 452-534.
- Watry, David M. (2014). Diplomacy at the Brink: Eisenhower, Churchill and Eden in the Cold War. Baton Rouge, LA: Louisiana State University Press.

== Historiography and interpretations by scholars ==
- Burk, Robert. "Eisenhower Revisionism Revisited: Reflections on Eisenhower Scholarship", Historian, Spring 1988, Vol. 50, Issue 2, pp. 196–209
- Cook, Blanche Wiesen (1981). The Declassified Eisenhower: A Divided Legacy. Doubleday.
- Ferrell, Robert H. (1992). Ill-Advised: Presidential Health and Public Trust. University of Missouri Press. ISBN 978-0-8262-1065-4. LCCN 92018527.
- McAuliffe, Mary S. "Eisenhower, the President", Journal of American History 68 (1981), pp. 625–32 JSTOR 1901942
- McMahon, Robert J. "Eisenhower and Third World Nationalism: A Critique of the Revisionists," Political Science Quarterly (1986) 101#3 pp. 453–73 JSTOR 2151625
- Pach, Chester J. ed. A Companion to Dwight D. Eisenhower (2017), new essays by experts; stress on historiography.
- Pickett, William B. (1995). Dwight David Eisenhower and American Power. Wheeling, Ill.: Harlan Davidson. ISBN 0-88295-918-2. OCLC 31206927.
- Pickett, William B. (2000). Eisenhower Decides to Run: Presidential Politics and Cold War Strategy. Chicago: Ivan R. Dee. ISBN 1-56663-787-2. OCLC 43953970.
- Polsky, Andrew J. "Shifting Currents: Dwight Eisenhower and the Dynamic of Presidential Opportunity Structure," Presidential Studies Quarterly, March 2015.
- Rabe, Stephen G. "Eisenhower Revisionism: A Decade of Scholarship," Diplomatic History (1993) 17#1 pp 97–115.
- Schlesinger Jr., Arthur. "The Ike Age Revisited," Reviews in American History (1983) 11#1 pp. 1–11 JSTOR 2701865
- Streeter, Stephen M. "Interpreting the 1954 U.S. Intervention In Guatemala: Realist, Revisionist, and Postrevisionist Perspectives," History Teacher (2000) 34#1 pp 61–74. JSTOR 3054375
- Warshaw, Shirley Anne, ed. (1993). Reexamining the Eisenhower presidency. Westport, Connecticut: Greenwood Press. ISBN 0-313-28792-9.

== Primary sources ==
- Boyle, Peter G., ed. (1990). The Churchill–Eisenhower Correspondence, 1953–1955. University of North Carolina Press.
- Boyle, Peter G., ed. (2005). The Eden–Eisenhower correspondence, 1955–1957. University of North Carolina Press. ISBN 0-8078-2935-8
- Butcher, Harry C. (1946). My Three Years With Eisenhower The Personal Diary of Captain Harry C. Butcher, USNR, candid memoir by a top aide
- Eisenhower, Dwight D. (1948). Crusade in Europe, his war memoirs.
- Eisenhower, Dwight D. (1963). Mandate for Change, 1953–1956.
- Eisenhower, Dwight D. (1965). The White House Years: Waging Peace 1956–1961, Doubleday and Co.
- Eisenhower Papers 21-volume scholarly edition; complete for 1940–1961.
- Eisenhower, Dwight D. (1981). Ferrell, Robert H. (ed.). The Eisenhower Diaries. Norton. LCCN 80027866.
- Hagerty, James Campbell (1983). Ferrell, Robert H. (ed.). The Diary of James C. Hagerty: Eisenhower in Mid-Course, 1954-1955. Indiana University Press. ISBN 978-0-253-11625-3.
- Summersby, Kay (1948). Eisenhower was My Boss, New York: Prentice Hall; (1949) Dell paperback.
