= Parmet =

Surname

Parmet is a Jewish surname derived from the Yiddish word "permentyon" (פּערמענטיאָן), meaning parchment. It is most common in the United States, Eastern Europe, East Africa, and the Netherlands. Notable people with the surname include:

- Adalbert Parmet (1830–1898), German professor and priest
- Herbert Parmet (1929–2017), American author and historian, father of Wendy
- Laurel Parmet (born 1989), American filmmaker, daughter of Phil
- Matthias Parmet (1833–1917), German military chaplain and clergyman
- Phil Parmet (born 1942), American cinematographer, still photographer, and producer, father of Laurel
- Robert Parmet (born 1938), American professor
- Simon Parmet (1897–1969), Finnish composer
- Wendy E. Parmet, American author and professor, daughter of Herbert

== See also ==
- Entry for Parmet on Wiktionary
