= Draft Eisenhower movement =

Movement advocating American general for president

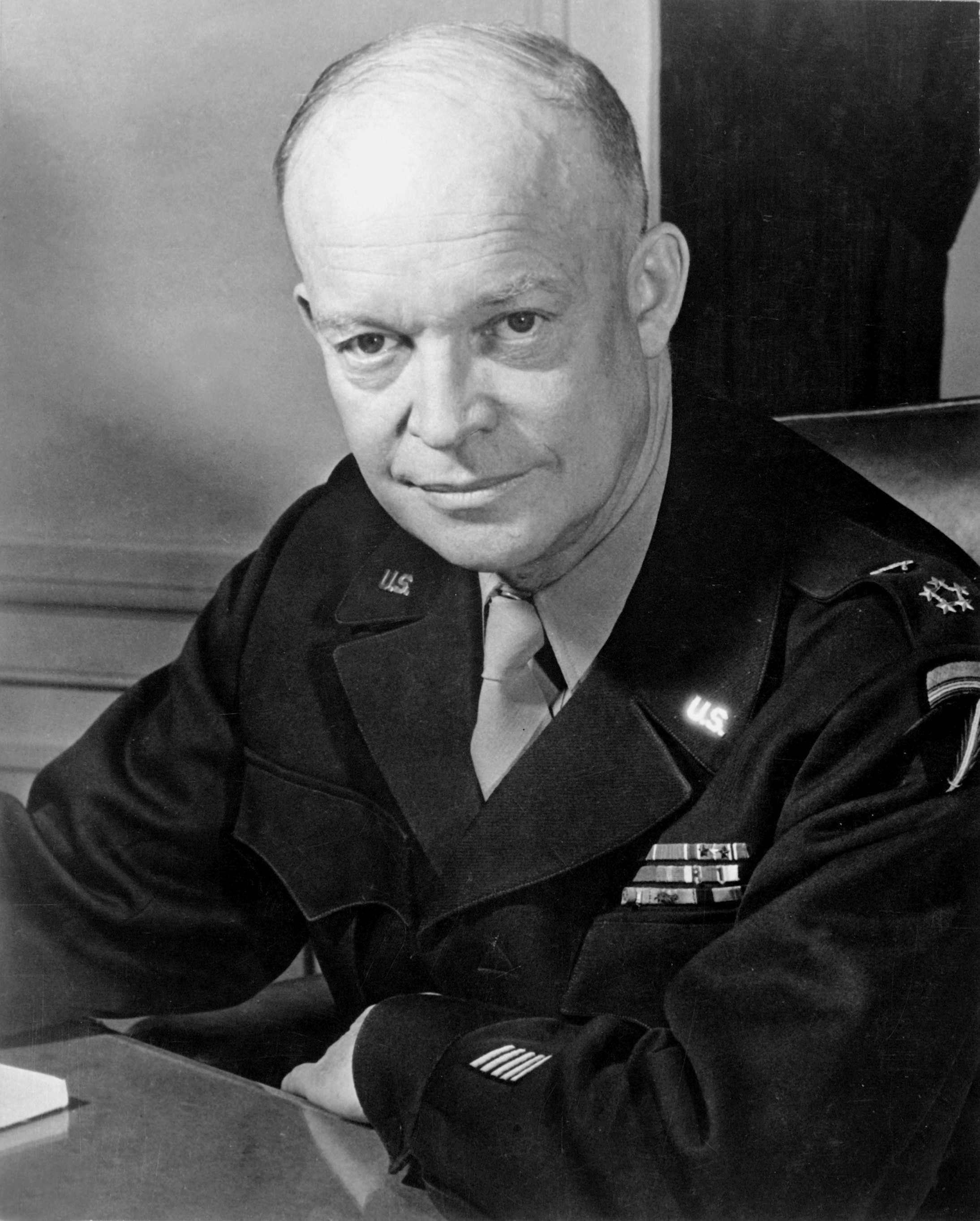
1945 portrait of Dwight D. Eisenhower

The Draft Eisenhower movement was a widespread political movement that eventually persuaded Dwight D. Eisenhower, former Chief of Staff of the United States Army, to contest the presidency of the United States.

During the 1948 presidential election, despite being asked repeatedly by various organizations and politicians, including former president Franklin D. Roosevelt's son James, Eisenhower rejected all requests to enter politics. Even after his refusal, Democratic state organizations in Georgia and Virginia openly endorsed him. A week before the 1948 Democratic National Convention, Roosevelt sent telegrams to all 1,592 delegates voting for the party nomination, asking them to arrive in Philadelphia two days early for a special Draft Eisenhower caucus attempting to make a strong joint appeal to Eisenhower. Despite attempts by several prominent Democratic politicians, Eisenhower refused to accept the nomination, which went to incumbent President Harry S. Truman.

Amid Truman's low popularity, the Draft Eisenhower movement re-emerged in 1951 in both the Republican and Democratic parties, as Eisenhower had not yet announced any political party affiliation. Several Republican politicians endorsed him, while Democrats continued to assure him that he could win the presidency only as a Democrat. Republican senator Henry Cabot Lodge Jr. became the campaign manager for the Republican Draft Eisenhower movement and placed Eisenhower's name on the New Hampshire Republican primary ballot. Eisenhower agreed to contest the presidency and subsequently won the New Hampshire primary. Nominated by the Republican Party as their presidential candidate, Eisenhower defeated Democrat Adlai Stevenson to become the 34th president. The Draft Eisenhower movement has been referenced in later draft movements, including the 1992 Draft Perot movement and the 2008 Draft Condi movement.

== Background ==
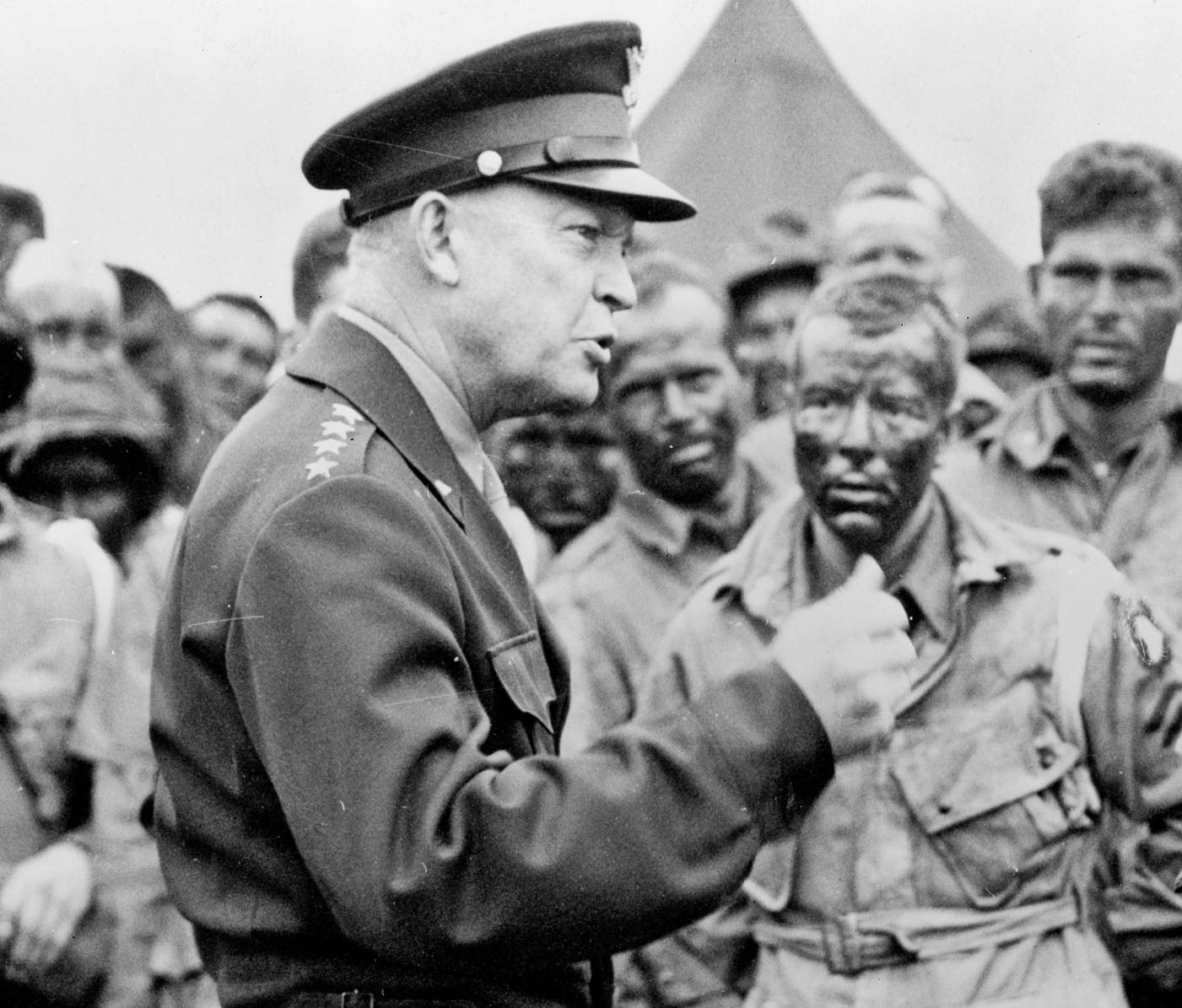
Eisenhower addressing American paratroopers prior to D-Day on June 5, 1944

Dwight D. Eisenhower graduated in 1915 from the United States Military Academy at West Point, New York, with "the class the stars fell on". During World War I, his request to serve in Europe was denied, and he commanded a unit that trained tank crews instead. After the war, he served under General Douglas MacArthur both in Washington, D.C., and the Philippines. He was promoted to brigadier general in 1941. Eisenhower oversaw several key operations during World War II. He served as commander of the Allied Expeditionary Force in Europe, planning and directing the 1944 Normandy invasion and the subsequent allied invasion of Germany, and rose to the position of five-star general.

Eisenhower was hailed a war hero; he led the list of Gallup Poll's "most admired man" in the 1940s. Field Marshal Bernard Montgomery referred to him as a "military statesman". He served as the Chief of Staff of the Army from 1945 to 1948. In this role, he made several public appearances to maintain support for the army. He also served as the president of Columbia University from 1948 until 1953. In December 1950, he was named supreme commander of the North Atlantic Treaty Organization (NATO) and given operational command of NATO forces in Europe.

== "Eisenhower boom" (1948) ==
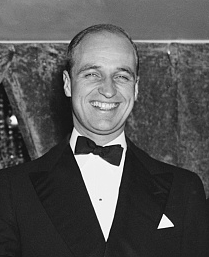
James Roosevelt (pictured in 1937) campaigned for Eisenhower to take Truman's place on the Democratic ticket.

Because of his popularity, Eisenhower was widely expected to run for the presidency. In December 1946, the Washington Times-Herald reported that Eisenhower had agreed to run, if people requested him. However, Eisenhower declined, stating "This sort of talk is most harmful to the army and to me as Chief of Staff ...". Yet both the Democratic and Republican parties formed Draft Eisenhower movements, as Eisenhower had not announced a political party affiliation. In July 1947, President Harry S. Truman considered him an ideal candidate for the Democratic Party, and wanted to "groom the general to follow him". That month, Truman even secretly offered to be the vice-presidential candidate if the general would run for president as a Democrat. In a public statement, Eisenhower declined all requests to enter politics. Momentum among Americans for Democratic Action (ADA) members and politicians grew for the Draft Eisenhower movement—to the extent that some Democratic politicians began organizing a "Dump Truman" effort to persuade Eisenhower to run as a Democrat. New York Representative W. Sterling Cole voiced his opposition to the nomination of Eisenhower or any other military leader for the presidency. In January 1948, a few Republican politicians from New Hampshire entered a group of delegates pledged to Eisenhower in the primary contest. Later that month, Eisenhower told that since George Washington's presidency, the office of president has "historically and properly fallen only to aspirants", and repeated that he had no political ambition. In a poll conducted in March by columnist Walter Winchell, Eisenhower won over 36,000 votes out of the total 95,000 votes, defeating both Truman and the eventual Republican nominee, Thomas E. Dewey.

On April 3, 1948, ADA declared its decision to support a Democratic Party ticket of Eisenhower and Supreme Court Justice William O. Douglas, owing to Truman's lack of popular support. Adolf A. Berle Jr. and Franklin D. Roosevelt Jr. expressed their belief that Eisenhower would accept the nomination. Although Truman ran in the primaries with very little opposition, the "Eisenhower craze" was in full swing among some Democrats a few weeks before the Democratic National Convention. President Franklin D. Roosevelt's son, James, campaigned for Eisenhower to contest the nomination and take Truman's place on the Democratic ticket.

Despite his refusals, Eisenhower was still being pursued by political leaders. Several polling agencies' polls suggested Eisenhower was likely to defeat Dewey in the presidential election if he ran in place of Truman. On April 5, 1948, Eisenhower stated again that he would not accept the nomination. In early July, Democratic state organizations in Georgia and Virginia, and former New York Supreme Court Justice Jeremiah T. Mahoney, openly endorsed Eisenhower. On July 5, a survey conducted by The New York Times revealed that support for Eisenhower as Democratic nominee for president was increasing among the delegates, fueled by an "anti–Truman Group" led by James Roosevelt, Jacob Arvey, and William O'Dwyer. Democratic Senator John C. Stennis of Mississippi declared his support for Eisenhower. At 10:30 p.m. that night, Eisenhower issued a memo at Columbia University for release, which read: "I will not, at this time, identify myself with any political party, and could not accept nomination for public office or participate in a partisan political contest."

Despite his statement, several organizations continued to ask Eisenhower to run for the presidency. He refused requests to endorse Dewey, although he told a few of his close friends he would vote for him, and expected Dewey to win the election. On July 6, 1948, a local Philadelphia group seized on Eisenhower's phrases about "political party" and "partisan political contest", and declared their continued support for him. The same day, Truman supporters expressed their satisfaction with the Eisenhower memo and their confidence in Truman's nomination.

A week before the Democratic National Convention, Roosevelt sent telegrams to all 1,592 delegates voting for the party nomination, asking them to arrive in Philadelphia two days early for a special "Draft Eisenhower" caucus attempting to make a strong joint appeal to Eisenhower. Columnist Drew Pearson wrote that, "If the Democrats failed to get Ike [Eisenhower] to run, every seasoned political leader in the Democratic Party is convinced Harry Truman will suffer one of the worst election defeats in history." Around 5,000 supporters gathered in front of Eisenhower's Columbia residence to ask him to run.

On July 8, Governor Strom Thurmond of South Carolina, who later walked out of the Democratic convention, publicly called and encouraged Eisenhower to run. Senator Claude Pepper of Florida said that he would place Eisenhower's name before the convention, "with or without the General's permission". Eisenhower replied, "No matter under what terms, conditions, or premises a proposal might be couched, I would refuse to accept the nomination." On the evening of July 9, Roosevelt conceded that Eisenhower would not accept the nomination, subsequently ending the draft. After Truman won the nomination, most of the polling agencies predicted Dewey would have a decisive lead over him. Yet, in an upset victory, Truman defeated Dewey in the 1948 presidential election. In his 1977 book, historian and author Herbert S. Parmet argued: "The Eisenhower boom was symptomatic of the abyss into which Democratic Liberals—and one must say not only Liberals—'had fallen'."

== "I like Ike" (1952) ==
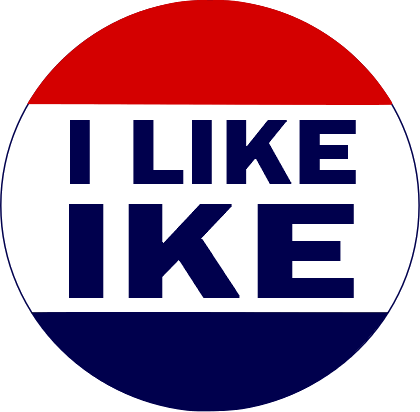
Eisenhower's 1952 campaign button, with "I Like Ike" written

The Draft Eisenhower movement re-emerged in 1951 in both the Republican and Democratic parties, as Eisenhower had not yet publicly announced any political party affiliation and believed that he needed to remain nonpartisan. However, in his 2000 book, Eisenhower Decides To Run, author William B. Pickett wrote that after the 1948 election, "Eisenhower was moving ever closer to partisan Republican politics". In late 1951, Truman's popularity had declined, with his approval ratings dropping to 23%, the lowest ever for any president since polling approval ratings began. Hoping that Eisenhower would run for the Democratic Party, Truman wrote to him in December 1951, saying: "I wish you would let me know what you intend to do." Eisenhower responded: "I do not feel that I have any duty to seek a political nomination." Various newspaper editors and reporters wrote letters to Eisenhower, urging him to run. Meanwhile, Dewey and Senator Henry Cabot Lodge Jr. began encouraging Eisenhower to run more than two years before the 1952 Republican National Convention. Dewey asked Lucius D. Clay—Eisenhower's former deputy—about his opinion on Eisenhower's potential presidential run, to which Clay replied: "I don't know. But I am sure that he will not run unless he is sure that there is a strong demand for him to run, an effective organization, and, I would add, although I'm not sure that he would, that there be every chance for it to be reasonably financed." Soon, various organizations and committees were set up to co-ordinate the Draft movement. New Jersey businessmen Charles F. Willis and Stanley M. Rumbough Jr. helped found the "Citizens for Eisenhower" committee, to establish Eisenhower clubs nationwide. Harold E. Talbott headed the "Eisenhower for President" financial campaign, and Paul Hoffman started the "Citizens for Eisenhower" movement. A network of approximately 800 clubs, headed by 38 state leaders, was soon formed. By late 1952, approximately 29,000 clubs had been formed, with a total membership of approximately 250,000 people. Eisenhower's close friend, investment dealer Clifford Roberts, referred to "Citizens for Eisenhower" as a name under which "all the mavericks can gather".

The "Ike for President" political advertisement by the Citizens for Eisenhower committee

Republican admirers coined the phrase "I Like Ike" (referring to Eisenhower's nickname, "Ike"). Irving Berlin included a song titled "They Like Ike" in his Broadway musical Call Me Madam. Although Eisenhower believed he would win the presidency more easily and with a larger congressional majority as a Democrat, he felt the Truman administration had become corrupt and that the next president would have to reform the government without having to defend past policies. The internationalist wing of the Republican Party saw Eisenhower as an alternative to the more isolationist candidate—Senator Robert A. Taft, the son of former president and chief justice William Howard Taft. Before the primaries, Taft was widely referred to as "Mr. Republican", and insiders considered him to be the front-runner for the nomination. Former Minnesota governor Harold Stassen, popular for his views endorsing internationalism, also ran in the primaries. According to author Michael J. Birkner, "Neither man radiated the political appeal that said 'winner'."

In 1951, more Republican politicians announced their support for Eisenhower, while Democrats continued to assure him that he could only win the presidency as a Democrat. Taft announced his candidacy for the Republican nomination on October 16. On November 17, Lodge became the campaign manager for the Draft Eisenhower movement. Sherman Adams, the Republican governor of New Hampshire, became the manager for the Draft Eisenhower movement in his state. Adams began to assemble an Eisenhower organization in late 1951. Speaking at a rally in November 1951, he exclaimed that: "Eisenhower will have his name on the March 11 ballot, he will not withdraw his name from our presidential primary. Of that I am now certain." By December, the movement had grown to the point that Eisenhower had Clifford Roberts secretly organize a political advisory group of close, trusted advisors to watch the movement. Clay wrote a memorandum to Eisenhower, detailing the state of the campaign and noting the dates of the upcoming state conventions.

As the momentum behind Taft's candidacy grew, Eisenhower's reluctance to run declined. He told Lodge that he considered himself a Republican, which Lodge revealed during a January 6, 1952, press conference. As Eisenhower's position on his candidacy for the New Hampshire primary remained unclear, Lodge sought help from William E. Robinson, the publisher of the New York Herald Tribune. When Robinson traveled to Europe to spend Christmas with Eisenhower, he asked him whether he would allow his name to be placed on the New Hampshire ballot; Eisenhower agreed. On January 6, 1952, authorized by Clay and Robinson, Lodge placed Eisenhower's name on the New Hampshire primary ballot. Soon, 24 newspapers, including The New York Times, endorsed Eisenhower. Senator Paul Douglas even suggested both parties to nominate Eisenhower with different vice-presidential running mates.

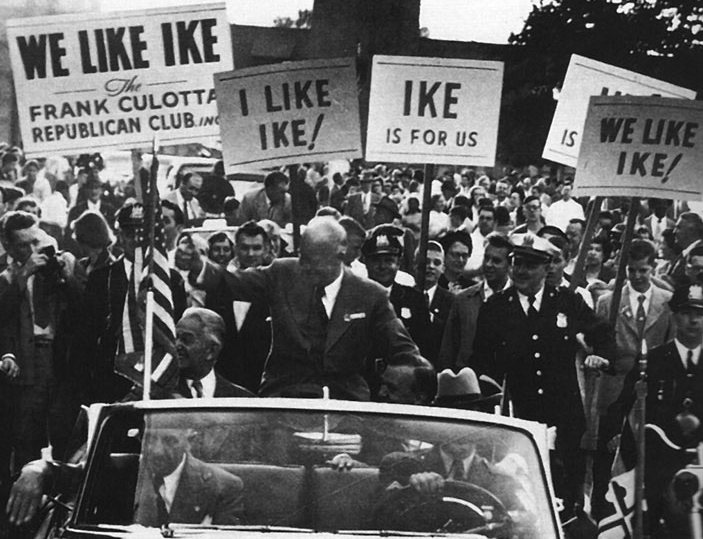
Eisenhower campaigning in Baltimore, September 1952

On February 8, 1952, a Draft Eisenhower rally was scheduled to be held in Madison Square Garden. The event planners expected no more than the arena's 16,000 person capacity, but over 25,000 showed up, and the New York City police and fire marshals could get very few people to leave. On February 16, Eisenhower told Clay of his irrevocable decision to contest the presidency if nominated by the Republicans. On March 11, he won the New Hampshire primary against Taft by a margin of approximately 12 percent. He won all 14 of the state's convention delegates. Eisenhower announced he was "astounded" and "moved" by the results, and told a reporter: "Any American who would have that many other Americans pay him that compliment would be proud or he would not be an American."

On March 18, more than 106,000 people voted for "Eisenhower", "Isenhowr", or "Ike" as a write-in candidate in the Minnesota presidential primary, only 20,000 votes behind Stassen. The editor of The Kansas City Star, Roy A. Roberts, called it "one of the biggest things that ever happened in an American political campaign". Eisenhower asked to be relieved of his NATO assignment and retired from active service on May 31. On June 4, he made his first political speech in his hometown of Abilene, Kansas, where he also conducted a press conference. On being asked about his voting record, he said: "In 1948, I left uniformed duty and did not register because I hoped to remain neutral. But, in 1950, I voted Republican." A poll conducted by Gallup days before the Republican Convention showed Eisenhower leading by 25% over Truman and 16% over Taft. The Republican National Convention nominated Eisenhower on the first ballot. To counteract the issue of his age, his advisors advised him to select 39-year-old Senator Richard Nixon as his running mate. Eisenhower and Nixon won the 1952 presidential election in a landslide, defeating Democratic nominees Adlai Stevenson and John Sparkman by a margin of 353 electoral votes.

== Aftermath and legacy ==
With Eisenhower's inauguration on January 20, 1953, he became the first Republican president in 20 years. He selected Lodge as ambassador to the United Nations, and Adams as the White House Chief of Staff. During his presidency, he supported "Modern Republicanism" that occupied a middle ground between the liberal wing of the Democratic Party and the conservative wing of the Republican Party. He negotiated an end to the Korean War, resulting in the partition of Korea. In September 1955, he suffered a heart attack, and was hospitalized for 6 weeks. His prospects of running for re-election soon became the country's major talking point. Republican politicians argued that they could lose the election without Eisenhower as their presidential nominee. Initially pessimistic about undertaking a second term, after being persuaded by various Republican leaders through another draft movement, he agreed to run for re-election. He was re-elected in 1956, defeating Stevenson again in a landslide victory. Later, Eisenhower told his advisors: "You know, if it hadn't been for that heart attack, I doubt if I would have been a candidate again."

In 1967 and 1968, years after leaving the presidency, Eisenhower was still named the "most admired man" by the Gallup Poll. The "Citizens for Eisenhower" committee remained active even after the 1952 election, supporting the modernization of the Republican conservative agenda. The Draft Eisenhower movement has been referenced in later draft movements including the 1992 Draft Perot movement and the 2008 Draft Condi movement. In his 2000 book, Pickett wrote:

In truth, Eisenhower's decision to become a candidate was less complicated, not to mention less devious, and more honorable. Certainly in later years, as revealed in his memoirs, he liked to think of himself as having succumbed to a draft. Before publicly announcing his candidacy, he received continual and mounting pressure to run for office from public opinion polls, journalists, opinion leaders, and politicians. But if being drafted meant that he did nothing to forward his candidacy until he was nominated by the party convention (something that he often mentioned as desirable), then he was not.

== Works cited ==
- Ambrose, Stephen E. (1983). Eisenhower. Vol. One. Simon & Schuster. ISBN 978-0-671-44069-5. LCCN 83009892. OL 3167850M – via Open Library.
- Baime, A. J. (2020). Dewey Defeats Truman – The 1948 Election and the Battle for America's Soul. Houghton Mifflin Harcourt. ISBN 978-1-328-58506-6. OL 29821320M.
- Beschloss, Michael R.; Virga, Vincent (1990). Eisenhower – A Centennial Life. HarperCollins. ISBN 978-0-06-016418-8. LCCN 89046225. OL 2219098M – via Open Library.
- Birkner, Michael J. (2003). "'He's My Man' – Sherman Adams and New Hampshire's Role in the 'Draft Eisenhower' Movement". Historical New Hampshire. 58: 5–25. ISSN 0018-2508. Archived from the original on January 11, 2019 – via Gettysburg College.
- Busch, Andrew (2012). Truman's Triumphs – The 1948 Election and the Making of Postwar America. University Press of Kansas. ISBN 978-0-7006-1866-8. LCCN 2012020593. OL 26379614M – via Open Library.
- Daniel, Douglass K (2000). "They Liked Ike: Pro-Eisenhower Publishers and His Decision to Run for President". Journalism & Mass Communication Quarterly. 77 (2). Association for Education in Journalism and Mass Communication: 393–404. doi:10.1177/107769900007700211. ISSN 1077-6990. S2CID 144712540.
- Dishman, Robert B. (1953). "How It All Began – The Eisenhower Pre-Convention Campaign in New Hampshire, 1952". The New England Quarterly. 26 (1): 3–26. doi:10.2307/362333. JSTOR 362333.
- Eisenhower, Dwight D. (1981). Ferrell, Robert H. (ed.). The Eisenhower Diaries. W. W. Norton & Company. ISBN 978-0-393-33180-6 – via Open Library.
- Frank, Jeffrey (2013). Ike and Dick – Portrait of a Strange Political Marriage. Simon & Schuster. ISBN 978-1-4165-8701-9. LCCN 2012015138. OL 25290770M – via Open Library.
- Gilbert, Robert E. (2008). "Eisenhower's 1955 Heart Attack: Medical Treatment, Political Effects, and the 'Behind the Scene' Leadership Style". Politics and the Life Sciences. 27 (1). Cambridge University Press: 2–21. doi:10.2990/27_1_2. JSTOR 40072943. PMID 19213302. S2CID 19518699.
- Greenstein, Fred I. (1982). The Hidden-Hand Presidency – Eisenhower as Leader. Basic Books. ISBN 978-0-465-02948-8. LCCN 82070847. OL 3511120M – via Open Library.
- Griffith, Robert (1970). "The General and the Senator – Republican Politics and the 1952 Campaign in Wisconsin". Wisconsin Magazine of History. Vol. 54, no. 1. Wisconsin Historical Society. pp. 23–29. JSTOR 4634580.
- Immerman, Richard H. (1999). John Foster Dulles – Piety, Pragmatism, and Power in U.S. Foreign Policy. Scholarly Resources. ISBN 978-0-8420-2601-7.
- Karabell, Zachary (2001). The Last Campaign – How Harry Truman Won the 1948 Election. Doubleday. ISBN 978-0-307-42886-8. OL 7426117M – via Open Library.
- Keefer, Edward C. (1986). "President Dwight D. Eisenhower and the End of the Korean War". Diplomatic History. 10 (3). Oxford University Press: 267–289. doi:10.1111/j.1467-7709.1986.tb00461.x. JSTOR 24911673.
- Lemelin, Bernard (2001). "The U.S. Presidential Election of 1948 – The Causes of Truman's 'Astonishing' Victory". Revue française d'études américaines. 87: 38–61. doi:10.3917/rfea.087.0038. ISSN 0397-7870. Archived from the original on December 10, 2021 – via Cairn.info.
- Mason, Robert (2013). "Citizens For Eisenhower and the Republican Party, 1951–1965" (PDF). The Historical Journal. 56 (2). Cambridge University Press: 513–536. doi:10.1017/S0018246X12000593. S2CID 54894636.
- McCullough, David (1992). Truman. Simon & Schuster. ISBN 978-0-671-86920-5. LCCN 92005245. OL 1704072M – via Open Library.
- Morris, Kenneth E.; Schwartz, Barry (1993). "Why They Liked Ike – Tradition, Crisis, and Heroic Leadership". The Sociological Quarterly. 34 (1). Midwest Sociological Society: 131–151. doi:10.1111/j.1533-8525.1993.tb00134.x. JSTOR 4121562.
- Pach, Chester J.; Richardson, Elmo (1991). The Presidency of Dwight D. Eisenhower (Revised ed.). University Press of Kansas. ISBN 978-0-7006-0436-4. LCCN 90045952. OL 1884970M – via Open Library.
- Parmet, Herbert S. (1977). The Democrats – The Years After FDR. Oxford University Press. ISBN 978-0-19-519971-0 – via Open Library.
- Pickett, William B. (2000). Eisenhower Decides to Run: Presidential Politics and Cold War Strategy. Ivan R. Dee. ISBN 9781566633253 – via Open Library.
- Pusey, Merlo J. (1956). Eisenhower – The President. Macmillan Publishers – via Open Library.
- Guide to U.S. Elections (6th ed.). SAGE Publications. 2010. ISBN 978-1-60426-536-1. LCCN 2009033938.
- Scheele, Henry Z. (1987). "The 1956 Nomination of Dwight D. Eisenhower – Maintaining the Hero Image". Presidential Studies Quarterly. 17 (3). Center for the Study of the Presidency and Congress: 459–471. JSTOR 27550439.
- Smith, Jean Edward (1990). Lucius D. Clay – An American life. Henry Holt and Company. ISBN 978-0-8050-0999-6. LCCN 89024720. OL 2202950M – via Open Library.
- Smith, Jean Edward (2012). Eisenhower in War and Peace. Penguin Random House LLC. ISBN 978-0-679-64429-3.
