= I Like Ike (disambiguation) =

"I Like Ike" is a slogan that was used in Dwight D. Eisenhower's 1952 United States presidential campaign.

- "Ike for President" (advertisement), also known as "I Like Ike", a television advertisement for Dwight D. Eisenhower's presidential campaign
- I Like Ike! The Best of Ike Turner, a 1994 compilation album
