= William Hitchcock =

William Hitchcock may refer to:

- William I. Hitchcock, professor of history
- William Mellon Hitchcock, member of the Mellon family, involved in the psychedelic drug scene of the 1960s and 1970s
- Bill Hitchcock (born 1965), Canadian football player
- Billy Hitchcock (1916–2006), American baseball infielder, coach, manager and scout
