= Dwight David Eisenhower and American Power =

1995 biography by William B. Pickett

- Author: William B. Pickett
- Series: American Biographical HistorySeries
- Genre: Non-fiction
- Publisher: Harlan Davidson
- Publication date: 1995
- Publication place: United States
- Pages: 215
- ISBN: 0-88-295918-2
- OCLC: 31206927

Dwight David Eisenhower and American Power is a 1995 biography of the U.S. president and military leader by historian William B. Pickett, a professor (now emeritus) at Rose-Hulman Institute of Technology in Terre Haute, Indiana. It was published as part of Harlan Davidson's American Biographical History Series.

== Synopsis ==
Divided into six parts, the book chronicles Eisenhower's early life, wartime service, presidency and retirement. In addition to telling Eisenhower's life story, the book was a re-examination of his political legacy, part of a trend challenging previous historians' views of his presidency as weak. With access to previously classified documents from both the United States and Soviet Union, as well as eight months of research at the Eisenhower Library, Pickett was able to show a different side to Eisenhower. Eisenhower's approach to issues of power and strategy is a consistent theme throughout the book. Although Pickett acknowledges that Eisenhower's corporate ties and dislike of New Deal policies made him "[fail] to understand the problems of the poor, the elderly, and the many who suffered discrimination," he argues that Eisenhower also brought to the White House a set of skills and experience that made him perhaps uniquely suited for handling the problems of the Cold War, helping to create the conditions for the peace, prosperity and economic growth that were the hallmark of the 1950s. The book suggests that the strategic talents Eisenhower displayed as Supreme Commander of Allied forces were not only the key to victory in Europe during World War Two, but carried over usefully to his second career as a civilian politician. Despite his military background, he believed in avoiding war and that the Cold War was a largely political and economic rather than military crisis. Despite Eisenhower's serious misgivings about the rise of corporate power and the military-industrial complex, which he warned against in his 1960 farewell address, Pickett suggests that Eisenhower's coolheadedness and focus on international affairs helped leave the world more stable than it was before his presidency, and established the dominance of the United States as both a world power and a haven for the world's refugees.

== Critical response ==
Reaction to the book was positive. Indianapolis Star reviewer Lawrence S. Conner called it a "concise and readable" work that helped to revise previous historians' "harsh assessments of Eisenhower." In the journal Presidential Studies Quarterly, Herbert Parmet called the book a "gracefully written … wise little book," offering a view of Eisenhower as a politician who "understood and moved with the rhythms of history." Writing in the Journal of American History, reviewer Robert J. McMahon called it an "admirably compact and lucid survey"; he felt that Pickett was not critical enough of Eisenhower's failures, but also felt the book had "marked strengths" including a lively writing style that made it an effective introduction to the Eisenhower era.

Pickett followed up the book in 2000 with Eisenhower Decides to Run: Presidential Politics and Cold War Strategy, a look at the events and decisions that shaped the 1952 Republican Party presidential primaries and general election.
