= The Age of Eisenhower =

2018 nonfiction book

The Age of Eisenhower: America and the World in the 1950s
- First edition
- Author: William Hitchcock
- Genre: History
- Publisher: Simon & Schuster
- Publication date: 2018
- Publication place: United States
- Media type: Book
- Pages: 672
- ISBN: 978-1439175668

The Age of Eisenhower: America and the World in the 1950s is a 2018 book written by William I. Hitchcock and published by Simon & Schuster. In the book, Hitchcock covers the presidency of Dwight Eisenhower in the 1950s. Upon its release, the book received generally positive reviews.

== Background ==
The book is written by William Hitchcock, a historian who studies modern European history and Cold War history. Hitchcock spent eight years researching and writing the book, using archives from the Eisenhower Presidential Library, the National Archives at College Park, the Library of Congress, and the Miller Center for Public Affairs.

== Contents ==
The Age of Eisenhower covers the Eisenhower presidency, including domestic affairs, which Hitchcock labelled as "a middle way", McCarthyism, and civil rights but focuses mainly on foreign affairs and the president's handling of the Cold War. The book contends that Eisenhower's presidency is notable due to "the absence of large-scale conflict" and stability, and described him as a "hardworking, skillful president". However, Hitchcock criticised elements of the administration's foreign affairs policies, handling of McCarthyism, and a mixed record of civil rights.

== Reception ==
Kirkus Reviews praised the book as a "measured, mostly admiring" biography with a "lengthy, well-documented argument" but criticised it as inferior compared to Eisenhower in War and Peace by Jean Edward Smith. This sentiment was shared by a review from The Economist, which also complimented the book's overall verdict. Likewise, Steven Casey, reviewing in Cold War History, lauded the book as timely, and "cogently argued". Casey additionally praised the book's writing as elegant. Publishers Weekly described the book as a revisionist biography, praising its comprehensiveness, persuasion, and usage of documents. The review concluded that the author "succeeds in positioning Ike as a world-historical figure". Similarly, Bryce Christensen from Booklist called the book "complete and persuasive". Reviewing from The Wall Street Journal, Richard Rhodes generally praised the book as a "rich narrative". Alvin S. Felzenberg from The Claremont Review of Books described the book as masterly, and concluded that the book "should provide a decent burial to one of the worst predictions in U.S. history". David Stebenne from The American Historical Review commented that the book included "new and intriguing arguments" despite the familiarity of its subject matter. The reviewer additionally complimented Hitchcock's coverage of civil rights as "sensible and fair", but criticised the author's omission on why Eisenhower neglected this issue.

The book's coverage of foreign affairs was described as the main focus of the book. Casey called it as the book's centrepiece. Felzenberg also lauded the book's coverage of CIA coups. In contrast, David Watry, reviewing from Journal of Cold War Studies, criticised some of the descriptions of Eisenhower's foreign policy as misleading, commenting negatively towards Hitchcock's recount on the Korean Armistice Agreement. The review also reprobated the book's omissions regarding details of the 1956 Suez Crisis and the administration's handling of Vietnam in 1954, despite complimenting Hitchcock's coverage of domestic affairs. Watry concluded that the author "makes a good case for Eisenhower as a “consequential” president", while criticising several of Hitchcock's judgements. Stebenne expressed that the evidence Hitchcock used was impressive, despite Hitchcock's judgements on Eisenhower's foreign policy having some contradictions. The reviewer later summarised that the book had "a clear, coherent narrative", and also praised the prose and succinctness.
