= Adalbert Parmet =

German priest (1830–1898)

- Born: Adalbert Anton Friedrich Gerhardt Parmet; July 30, 1830; Münster, Westphalia, Kingdom of Prussia, German Confederation
- Died: November 20, 1898 (aged 68)
- Occupations: Priest; Professor
- Years active: 1854–1898

Academic background
- Education: University of Munster; University of Berlin
- Thesis: De Pane Graecorum (1862)

Academic work
- Discipline: Classical philology; Catholic theology

Adalbert Anton Friedrich Gerhard Parmet (July 30, 1830 – November 20, 1898) was a German Catholic priest and classical philologist who taught at the Royal Academy of Münster from 1869 until 1898.

== Education and career ==
Parmet attended the Gymnasium Paulinum in Munster from 1842 to 1849 and studied Catholic theology at the Royal Academy there from 1849 to 1852. After graduating, he worked as a prefect of studies at the Collegium Ludgerianum. In 1853, he solved a question at the college concerning the recipient, purpose, and content of the Epistle to the Hebrews, and was ordained a priest on 17 November of that year in Billerbeck, where he worked as a chaplain from 1854 to 1857.

Starting in 1857, Parmet continued to study at the Academy in Münster, although changed his focus from Catholic theology to classical philology. From 1859 to 1861 he studied at the University of Berlin. Returning to Münster, he earned his doctorate on 1 March 1862, with his dissertation written on the Greek god Pan written to Matthias Aulike.

After earning his habilitation in philology in 1863, Parmet began teaching at Münster's Academy, where he daughter for over 30 years. As a private lecturer, he lectured on Ancient Greek and Latin literature and grammar. He also wrote articles for the newspapers: Wiener Allgemeine Literatur-Zeitung, Literarischer Handweiser, and Theologische Literatur-Blatt. In 1869, he published a biography of the Münster humanist Rudolph von Langen, for which he evaluated numerous medieval manuscripts.

=== Works ===
- Parmet, Adalbertus (1862). De Pane Graecorum: Dissertatio Mythologica... (PDF) (in Latin). Münster.
- Parmet, Adalbert (1869). Rudolf von Langen: Leben und gesammelte Gedichte des ersten Münster'schen Humanisten (in German). Münster.

== Personal life ==
Parmet was the brother of military chaplain Matthias Parmet (1833–1917), who served as the vicar general of the Prussian field provost from 1870 to 1872.
