= George Bush: The Life of a Lone Star Yankee =

Biography of George H. W. Bush

- Author: Herbert S. Parmet
- Language: English
- Subject: George H. W. Bush
- Genre: Biography
- Publisher: Scribner
- Publication date: 1997
- Publication place: United States

George Bush: The Life of a Lone Star Yankee is a 1997 biography of George H. W. Bush written by Herbert S. Parmet and published by Scribner.

Andrew Delbanco of The New York Times described it as "the first full-scale biography" of Bush. According to Delbanco, the book's "theme is how George Bush found his father's patrician New England scruples a handicap in the changed political world to which his own ambition drew him."

== Background ==
The sources include interviews and diaries. The author did not have access to classified materials.

== Content ==
Delbanco wrote that the book includes "a meticulous account of Bush's rise to prominence in Texas". Delbanco states that descriptions of the subject are "valiant rather than insouciant within the historical limits in which [Bush] found himself."

According to Delbanco, the author, like others, "found it hard to tell just what George Bush believed" and that it "raises, again and again, the question of whether George Bush ever came to a moment in public life when he followed his convictions rather than his interests -- or whether there was any distinction between them" but does not get an answer to the question.

== Reception ==
Kirkus Reviews stated that the book "suffers from lack of greater access to still-secret materials and to aides with enough distance from the political wars to speak with unbuttoned candor about their boss."

The American Spectator stated that: "Herbert S. Parmet offers up a Theodore White-model of living history which, if not the final word on Bush's legacy, brings fresh insight to the three whys most often asked about his political rise and fall: (1) Why, despite telling friends of his "strong reservations" did Ronald Reagan pick him as a vice presidential running male in 1980; (2) Why, despite little personal knowledge of Dan Quayle, did Bush pick him as a vice presidential running male eight years later; (3) Why, after his unqualified "Read my lips" pledge at the Republican convention that same year, did Bush become party to the Democratic-inspired tax increase of 1990?"
