= Diplomacy at the Brink: Eisenhower, Churchill, and Eden in the Cold War =

- Author: David Watry
- Language: English
- Genre: History
- Publisher: LSU Press
- Publication date: 2014
- ISBN: 9780807157183

Diplomacy at the Brink: Eisenhower, Churchill, and Eden in the Cold War is a 2014 book by David Watry. The book examines the United Kingdom–United States relations during the 1950s, covering the foreign policies of Dwight Eisenhower, Winston Churchill, and Anthony Eden. Upon its release, some publications praised the book's research, whereas aspects of the book's depiction of Eisenhower were criticised by several reviewers.

== Contents ==
In Diplomacy at the Brink, Watry examines the United Kingdom–United States relations relationship in the 1950s and the deterioration of the Anglo-American relationship. He contests that Eisenhower's policies to Communist nations representing a "right-wing ideologue", compared to the détente policies of the Churchill and Eden administrations. The book covers events in the 1950s, including the Korean War, the response to Indochina and the Taiwan islands Quemoy and Matsu, covert operations, and the 1956 Suez Crisis.

== Reception ==
Andrew Holt from the Journal of Contemporary History lauded the book, describing it as important and praising the book's incorporation of archival sources from numerous nations. Samuel Hoff from International Social Science Review additionally praised the book as "an important contribution to literature on the Cold War", and noted that Eisenhower was portrayed with an "unfamiliar, negative shadow inconsistent with popular portrayals". The description of Eisenhower is also praised as "forcefully argued". Malcolm Craig from The Journal of the Historical Association complimented the book's engagement and research, describing the chapters as substantive and the overall argument being convincing, notwithstanding the lack of originality. However, Craig criticised the book's coverage of Eisenhower's views towards nuclear weapons as unpersuasive and stated that the book could focus more on the British attitudes. Still, the review overall concluded that Watry's book is well-researched and "raises intriguing points and offers new perspectives".

Richard M. Filipink from Presidential Studies Quarterly, despite praising the research, criticised the book's depiction of Eisenhower's "overt aggression" as not well corroborated, also critiquing the book's omissions and contradictions. The latter sentiment was shared by Anne Deighton from Journal of Cold War Studies, who, while praising the argument as stimulating, commented that aspects of the book were uncorroborated by evidence, and had "no rigorous analysis of the machinery of the state policymaking system".
