= Matthias Parmet =

German priest (1833–1917)

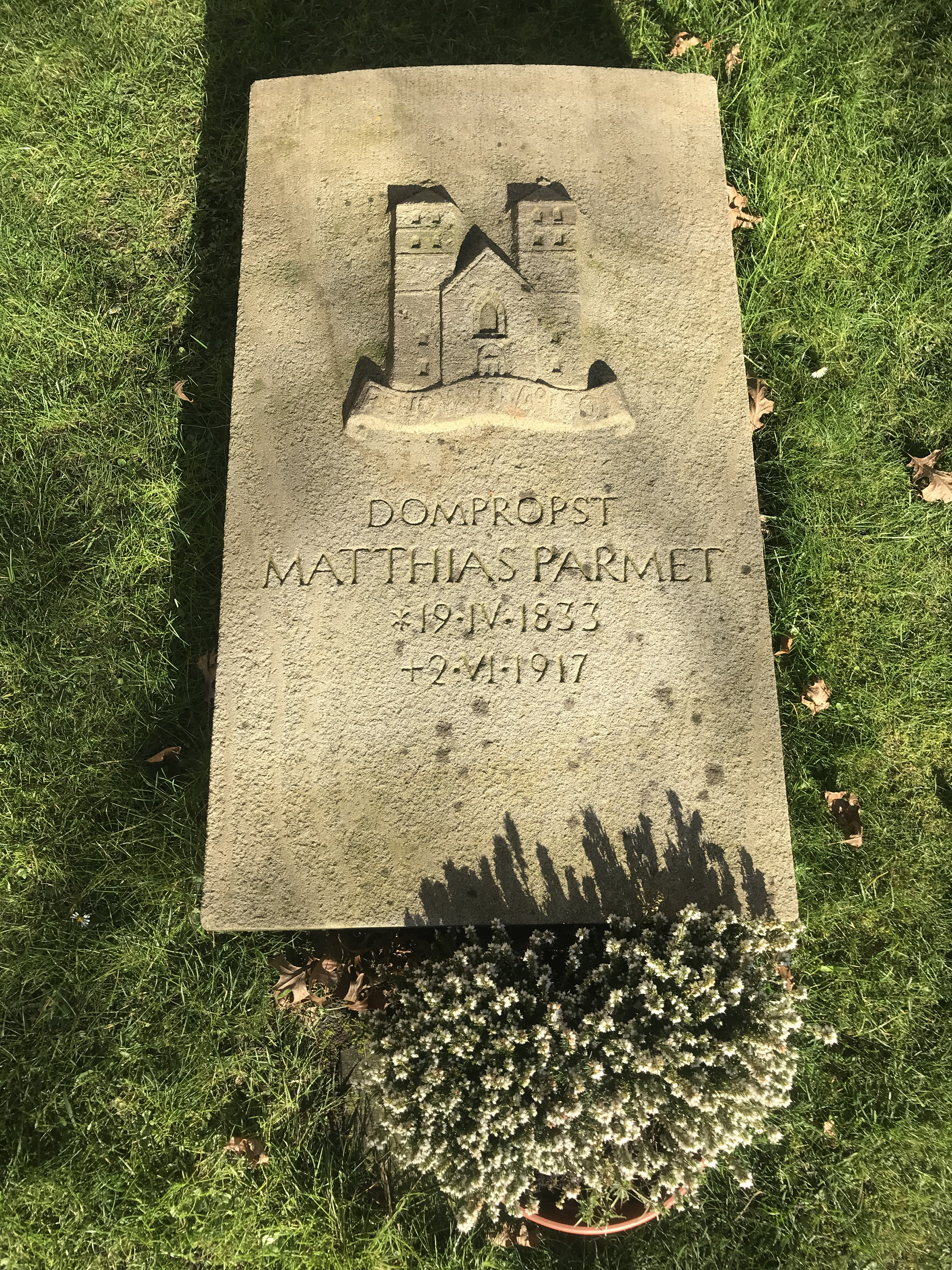
- Parmet's gravestone at Munster Cathedral
- Born: April 19, 1833; Münster, Kingdom of Prussia
- Died: June 2, 1917 (aged 84)
- Burial place: Münster Cathedral
- Occupation: Military field provost
- Relatives: Adalbert Parmet (brother)

Matthias Parmet (April 19, 1833 – June 2, 1917) was a German Catholic military chaplain.

== Career ==
Parmet was a Catholic priest, ordained in 1858, and began his career at a rectorate school in Ochtrup. Later, he was chaplain of the 2nd Guards Infantry Division, serving in Berlin from at least 1868 onwards. He later served as the vicar general of the Prussian field provost from 1870 to 1872. He, along with field bishop Franz Adolf Namszanowski were forced out of the military, and he was forced to return to his home city of Münster due to the Kulturkampf resulting in a German crackdown on Catholic control of its institutions. This led to the total abolition of the military chaplaincy position. Due to his work, he was a recipient of the Iron Cross, 2nd class, having earned it during service at the 1870 campaign during the Franco-Prussian War.

From 1884 to 1888, he was serving as the Provost at the Münster Cathedral. Dr. Joseph Giese, Vicar General of the city, had adamantly campaigned against the role, siding with the local Bishop who did not want Parmet in the position. Parmet got the role nonetheless, and was later elevated to Chairman of the Episcopal Officialate as well as the Papal Chamber Prelate; he worked there until his death in 1917.

== Personal life ==
Parmet was born in 1833 in Münster, then part of Prussia. He was the younger brother of Adalbert Parmet, who also became a Catholic priest and worked in academia.

He died on June 2, 1917, in his hometown at the age of 84. Emperor Wilhelm II sent condolences to his cathedral, "convey[ing] his condolences on the passing of a particularly distinguished and worthy man." He was buried in the cemetery at Münster Cathedral.
