= Matthias Aulike =

German jurist, politician and philologist (1807–1865)

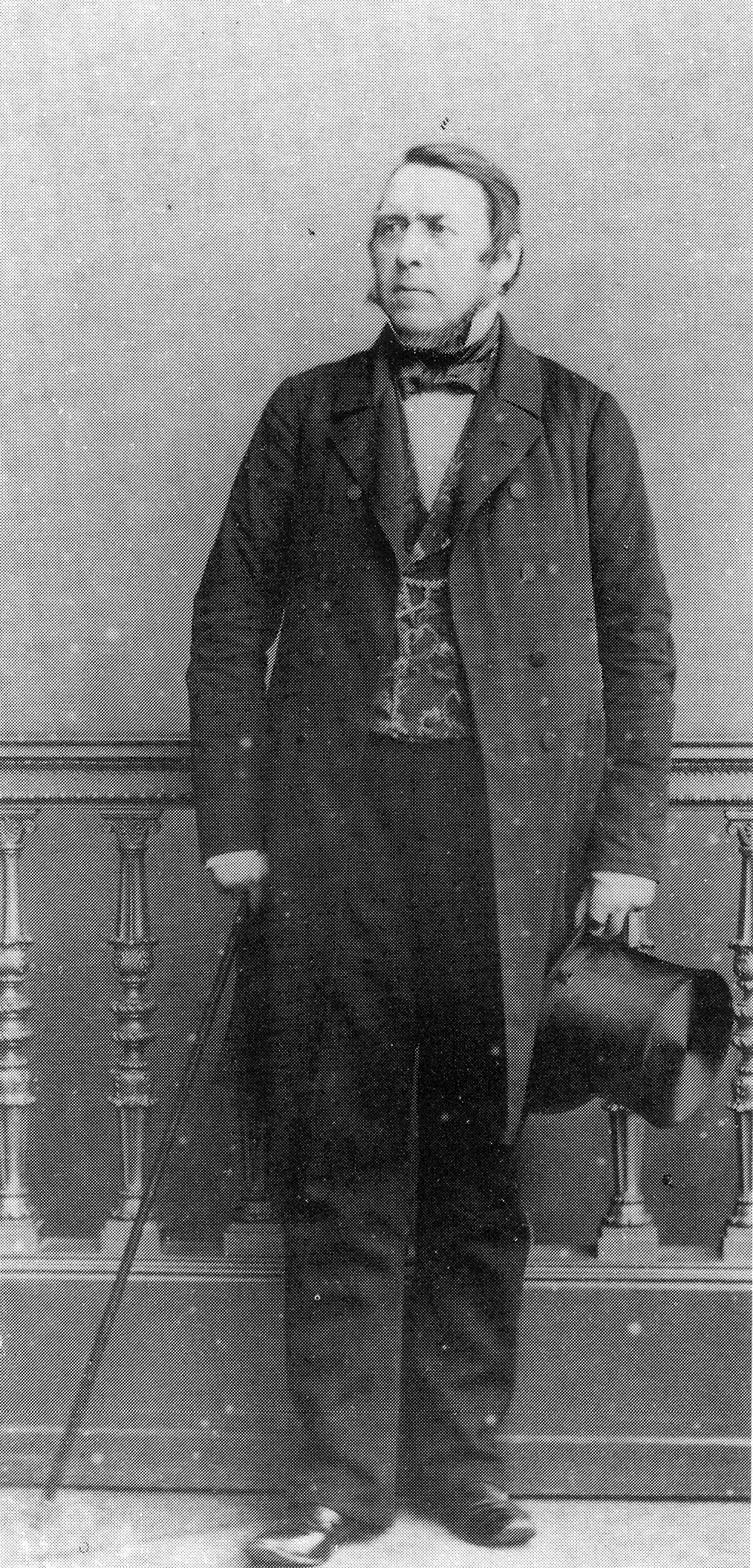

Matthias Johannes Franciscus Aulike (29 May 1807, Münster - 22 October 1865, Munich) was a civil servant, politician and benefactor of the Kingdom of Prussia.
