= Wendy E. Parmet =

American professor of law

- Occupations: Professor of law, legal analyst, author
- Spouse: Ronald Lanoue
- Children: 2
- Parent(s): Herbert Parmet, Joan Kronish

Academic background
- Education: Harvard University (1982)

Academic work
- Discipline: Public health law
- Institutions: Northeastern University

Wendy E. Parmet is an American legal analyst, author, professor of law at Northeastern University, and faculty director for its Center for Health Policy and Law.

== Career ==
Parmet is a distinguished professor of law at Northeastern University College of Social Sciences and Humanities and School of Law and Associate Dean for Academic Affairs. Her field of academics is focused on public health law, with other focuses in health law and disability law. She graduated from Harvard University with a Juris Doctor in 1982.

She was co-counsel for the plaintiff party in Bragdon v. Abbott (1998), where a person was denied healthcare treatment due to having HIV. Parmet was active in advocacy against discrimination and quarantine of those with AIDS during the height of the epidemic in the 1980s.

In 2005, Parmet co-authored Ethical Health Care with Patricia Illingworth. In 2009, she published her first solo book, Populations, Public Health, and the Law. In 2012, she co-authored Debates on U.S. health care. In 2017, she once again collaborated with Illingworth to publish The Health of Newcomers. In 2023, she published another book, Constitutional Contagion: COVID, the Courts, and Public Health.

=== Political opinions ===
Parmet was active in advocacy during the COVID-19 pandemic; she stated that she supported vaccine mandates for mitigation of the disease's spread. She was also pro-mask mandate and was critical of the injunction against a national mask mandate filed by Judge Kathryn Kimball in May 2021. She is pro-choice, and has voiced concerns about the restriction of abortion as precedent for the banning of other forms of contraceptives.

She has encouraged courts to utilise population health-based thinking in its legal analysis as a practical approach to public wellness.

== Personal life ==
She is the daughter of famed American historian and biographer Herbert Parmet and his wife Joan Kronish. She is married to Ronald Lanoue, and has two children. She currently resides in Massachusetts.

== Bibliography ==
=== Books ===
- Illingworth, Patricia; Parmet, Wendy E. (2005). Ethical Health Care. Routledge. pp. 296–386. doi:10.4324/9781351219945-5. ISBN 978-1-351-21994-5.
- Parmet, Wendy E. (2009). Populations, Public Health, and the Law (1st ed.). Georgetown University Press. ISBN 978-1-58901-261-5. JSTOR j.ctt2tt5pj.
- Kronenfeld, Jennie J.; Parmet, Wendy E.; Zezza, Mark A., eds. (2012). Debates on U.S. health care. A SAGE reference publication. Los Angeles, Calif.: SAGE. ISBN 978-1-4129-9602-0.
- Illingworth, Patricia; Parmet, Wendy E. (2017). "The Health of Newcomers". NYU Press. doi:10.18574/nyu/9780814789216.001.0001. ISBN 978-0-8147-8921-6.
- Parmet, Wendy E. (2023-05-31). Constitutional Contagion: COVID, the Courts, and Public Health (1 ed.). Cambridge University Press. doi:10.1017/9781009093835. ISBN 978-1-009-09383-5. S2CID 258805235.

=== Academic papers (selected works) ===
- Parmet, Wendy (1985-01-01). "AIDS and Quarantine: The Revival of an Archaic Doctrine". Hofstra Law Review. 14 (1).
- Brown, Judith; Parmet, Wendy; Baumann, Phyllis (1987-10-01). "The Failure of Gender Equality: An Essay in Constitutional Dissonance". Buffalo Law Review. 36 (3): 573. ISSN 0023-9356.
- Parmet, Wendy E. (1990). "Discrimination and Disability: The Challenges of the ADA". Law, Medicine and Health Care. 18 (4): 331–344. doi:10.1111/j.1748-720X.1990.tb01149.x. ISSN 0277-8459. PMID 2150973. S2CID 32596554.
- Parmet, Wendy (1993-01-01). "Health Care and the Constitution: Public Health and the Role of the State in the Framing Era". UC Law Constitutional Quarterly. 20 (2): 267–335. ISSN 0094-5617. PMID 11656278.
- Parmet, Wendy E. (1996-10-01). "From Slaughter-House to Lochner: The Rise and Fall of the Constitutionalization of Public Health". The American Journal of Legal History. 40 (4): 476–505. doi:10.2307/845413. JSTOR 845413.
- Parmet, Wendy; Gottlieb, Mark; Daynard, Richard (1997-01-01). "Accomodating [sic] Vulnerabilities to Environmental Tobacco Smoke: A Prism for Understanding the ADA". Journal of Law and Health. 12 (1): 1–38. ISSN 1044-6419. PMID 10182026.
- Parmet, Wendy E. (1999-12-03). "Tobacco, HIV, and the Courtroom: The Role of Affirmative Litigation in the Formation of Public Health Policy". Houston Law Review. 36 (5): 1663–1712.
- Olans Brown, Judith; Parmet, Wendy (2001-12-01). "The Imperial Sovereign: Sovereign Immunity & the ADA". University of Michigan Journal of Law Reform. 35 (1): 1–35. ISSN 0363-602X.
- Parmet, Wendy (2003). "Liberalism, Communitarianism, and Public Health: Comments on Lawrence O. Gostin's Lecture". Florida Law Review. 55 (5): 1221–1240. ISSN 1045-4241. PMID 15478249.
- Parmet, Wendy; Banthin, Christopher (2005-01-01). "Public Health Protection and the Commerce Clause: Controlling Tobacco in the Internet Age". New Mexico Law Review. 35 (1): 81. ISSN 0028-6214.
- Parmet, Wendy; Smith, Jason (2006-05-01). "Free Speech and Public Health: A Population-Based Approach to the First Amendment". Loyola of Los Angeles Law Review. 39 (1): 363. ISSN 0147-9857.
- Parmet, Wendy (2007-01-01). "Public Health and Constitutional Law: Recognizing the Relationship". Journal of Health Care Law and Policy. 10 (1): 13.
- Parmet, Wendy E. (2009-03-03). "Dangerous Perspectives: The Perils of Individualizing Public Health Problems". Journal of Legal Medicine. 30 (1): 83–108. doi:10.1080/01947640802694593. ISSN 0194-7648. PMID 19241274. S2CID 7243157.
- Parmet, Wendy (2013-01-01). "Quarantine Redux: Bioterrorism, AIDS and the Curtailment of Individual Liberty in the Name of Public Health". Health Matrix: The Journal of Law-Medicine. 13 (1): 85. ISSN 0748-383X.
- Parmet, Wendy (2015). "Free Speech and the Regulation of Reproductive Health". Journal of Law, Medicine & Ethics. 43 (1): 6–8. doi:10.1111/jlme.12191. ISSN 1073-1105. PMID 25846034. S2CID 32935679.
- Parmet, Wendy (2016-05-01). "Paternalism, Self-Governance, and Public Health: The Case of E-Cigarettes". University of Miami Law Review. 70 (3): 879.
- Parmet, Wendy (2016-09-01). "Population-Based Legal Analysis: Bridging the Interdisciplinary Chasm Through Public Health in Law". Journal of Legal Education. 66 (1): 100. ISSN 0022-2208.
- Parmet, Wendy E. (2016-12-01). "Health: Policy or Law? A Population-Based Analysis of the Supreme Court's ACA Cases". Journal of Health Politics, Policy and Law. 41 (6): 1061–1081. doi:10.1215/03616878-3665949. ISSN 0361-6878. PMID 27531938.
- Jacobson, Peter D.; Parmet, Wendy E. (2016-12-01). "Introduction: Perspectives on the Development of Population Health Law". Journal of Health Politics, Policy and Law. 41 (6): 1049–1059. doi:10.1215/03616878-3665922. ISSN 0361-6878. PMID 27531945.
- Parmet, Wendy E. (12 Dec 2018). "Quarantining the Law of Quarantine: Why Quarantine law Does Not Reflect Contemporary Constitutional Law" (PDF). Wake Forest University School of Law.
- Parmet, Wendy E. (2019-07-09). "The Worst of Health: Law and Policy at the Intersection of Health & Immigration". Indiana Health Law Review. 16 (2): 211–234. doi:10.18060/23296. ISSN 2374-2593. S2CID 199624090.
- Parmet, Wendy (2020-12-25). "The COVID Cases: A Preliminary Assessment of Judicial Review of Public Health Powers During a Partisan and Polarized Pandemic". San Diego Law Review. 57 (4): 999. ISSN 0036-4037. LCCN n79122466.
- Parmet, Wendy E. (2021-01-21). "Roman Catholic Diocese of Brooklyn v. Cuomo — The Supreme Court and Pandemic Controls". New England Journal of Medicine. 384 (3): 199–201. doi:10.1056/NEJMp2034280. ISSN 0028-4793. PMID 33326715. S2CID 229301430.
- Parmet, Wendy E. (2021-06-22). "COVID-19 Law and Policy Briefings, Series Two: State Efforts to Restrict Public Health Powers". Temple University. doi:10.34944/DSPACE/7387.
- Parmet, Wendy (2021-09-02). "Excluding Non-Citizens from the Social Safety Net". Georgia Journal of International & Comparative Law. 49 (3): 525. ISSN 0046-578X.
- Mello, Michelle M.; Parmet, Wendy E. (2021-09-23). "Public Health Law after Covid-19". New England Journal of Medicine. 385 (13): 1153–1155. doi:10.1056/NEJMp2112193. ISSN 0028-4793. PMID 34469644. S2CID 237387623.
- Haupt, Claudia E.; Parmet, Wendy E. (Winter 2021). "Public Health Originalism and the First Amendment". Washington and Lee Law Review. 78 (1) – via law.wlu.edu.
- Mello, Michelle M.; Parmet, Wendy E. (2022-03-03). "U.S. Public Health Law — Foundations and Emerging Shifts". New England Journal of Medicine. 386 (9): 805–808. doi:10.1056/NEJMp2200794. ISSN 0028-4793. PMID 35213103. S2CID 247106012.
- Parmet, Wendy E.; Khalik, Faith (2023-02-15). "Judicial Review of Public Health Powers Since the Start of the COVID-19 Pandemic: Trends and Implications". American Journal of Public Health. 113 (3): 280–287. doi:10.2105/AJPH.2022.307181. ISSN 0090-0036. PMC 9932394. PMID 36657096.
- Parmet, Wendy E.; Erwin, Paul C. (2023-03-01). "The Challenges to Public Health Law in the Aftermath of COVID-19". American Journal of Public Health. 113 (3): 267–268. doi:10.2105/AJPH.2022.307208. ISSN 0090-0036. PMC 9932389. PMID 36791356.
- Parmet, Wendy E.; Haupt, Claudia E. (2023-03-01). "Holding Clinicians in Public Office Accountable to Professional Standards". AMA Journal of Ethics. 25 (3): E194–199. doi:10.1001/amajethics.2023.194. ISSN 2376-6980. PMID 36867166. S2CID 257310681.
