= Eisenhower Decides To Run =

2000 book by historian William B. Pickett

Eisenhower Decides to Run: Presidential Politics and Cold War Strategy
- Author: William B. Pickett
- Genre: Non-fiction
- Publisher: Ivan R. Dee
- Publication date: 2000
- Publication place: United States
- ISBN: 1-56-663787-2
- OCLC: 43953970

Eisenhower Decides to Run: Presidential Politics and Cold War Strategy is a 2000 book by historian William B. Pickett, a professor (now emeritus) at Rose-Hulman Institute of Technology in Terre Haute, Indiana. It follows his 1995 Eisenhower biography Dwight David Eisenhower and American Power, and looks specifically at the reasons behind the five-star general's fateful choice to enter politics and become a candidate for the Republican nomination during the 1952 presidential campaign. (Eisenhower would go on to serve two full terms in the White House.)

== Synopsis ==
One of the first scholarly looks at the 1952 presidential campaign, Pickett's book focused on Eisenhower's political reputation, and challenged the notion that he was a reluctant presidential candidate who needed to be convinced to run, in what became known as the "Draft Eisenhower" movement. The idea that Eisenhower was an unwilling politician had been the standard view of historians, perhaps most widely championed in Stephen Ambrose's 1983-84 Eisenhower biography. With access to documents that had been recently declassified by the National Archives as well as private papers from the Eisenhower Library, Pickett's book showed that the truth was more complicated. Letters and diaries written by Eisenhower and his contemporaries offered evidence that Eisenhower's presidential ambitions were nascent as early as 1943 while he was Supreme Commander of Allied Forces during World War II, and that he began to actively encourage support for a presidential nomination in private when Supreme Commander of NATO in the early 1950s. A more skilled behind-the-scenes leader than was generally acknowledged, Eisenhower cultivated his "reluctant" reputation on purpose in order to boost his chances of a nomination, even remarking to a colleague that "since Washington's time, [drafts] have been carefully nurtured with the full, even though undercover, support of the 'victim.'" Though he had no direct political experience, Eisenhower had been repeatedly pulled into political discussions as the United States began its transition from the Second World War to the Cold War, and was concerned about the direction that other potential leaders would take the country, especially the isolationist right wing of the Republican Party. In particular, he wanted to block the ambitions of Ohio Senator Robert A. Taft, a leading Republican presidential candidate, who rejected Eisenhower's belief in a strong alliance between the U.S. and Western Europe. He was also cautious after witnessing the controversial political rise of his military rival Douglas MacArthur, with whom Eisenhower shared a mutual antipathy, whose own postwar presidential ambitions were derailed in part by Eisenhower's public statements arguing against the involvement of military leaders in civilian politics.

== Critical response ==
Reaction to the book was positive. Kenneth Osgood, writing in The Journal of American History, called the book "arguably the most thorough and comprehensive treatment of these years of Eisenhower's life." Chicago Sun-Times reviewer Steve Neal called it "fascinating", while The Indianapolis Star's David R. Richards called it "well written and carefully researched," but felt that it "suffered from a professor's desire to pack too many facts into each page." Writing for Michigan State University's H-Net forum, Steven Wagner called the book "an important and enlightening book" that "should be required reading for Eisenhower specialists."
