= Ike for President (advertisement) =

1952 campaign advertisement for Dwight D. Eisenhower produced by Disney

- The "Ike for President" advertisement (runtime 62 seconds)
- Client: Citizens for Eisenhower committee
- Running time: 62 seconds
- Release date: October 1952
- Production company: The Walt Disney Company
- Produced by: Roy O. Disney
- Country: United States

"Ike for President", sometimes referred to as "We'll Take Ike" or "I Like Ike", was a political television advertisement for Dwight D. Eisenhower's presidential campaign in 1952.

The minute-long animated advertisement was conceived by Jacqueline Cochran, a pilot and Eisenhower campaign aide, and Roy O. Disney of The Walt Disney Company, and produced by Disney volunteers. The ad's music was written by composer Irving Berlin. It begins with a bouncing "Ike" campaign button. Uncle Sam, dressed as a drum major, leads a parade, including a circus elephant, followed by a crowd of people with different occupations. Democratic vice presidential candidate John Sparkman, Secretary of State Dean Acheson, and President Harry S. Truman are depicted as Democratic donkeys. The spot's narrator concludes: "Now is the time for all good Americans to come to the aid of their country."

The advertisement's memorable jingle turned "Ike for President" into a popular catchphrase; its final line was described by Paul Christiansen as a "party-transcending appeal to voters". Adlai Stevenson II, Eisenhower's opponent, felt that the ad trivialized serious political issues and referred to it as the worst thing he ever heard. Eisenhower's organization planned to broadcast the advertisement five to six times every night during the final two weeks of the campaign in a few targeted areas. Eisenhower won the election in a landslide, though his campaign's advertising expert thought the ad made little difference. Time magazine later ranked "Ike for President" eighth in its list of the top ten campaign advertisements.

== Background ==
=== Eisenhower ===
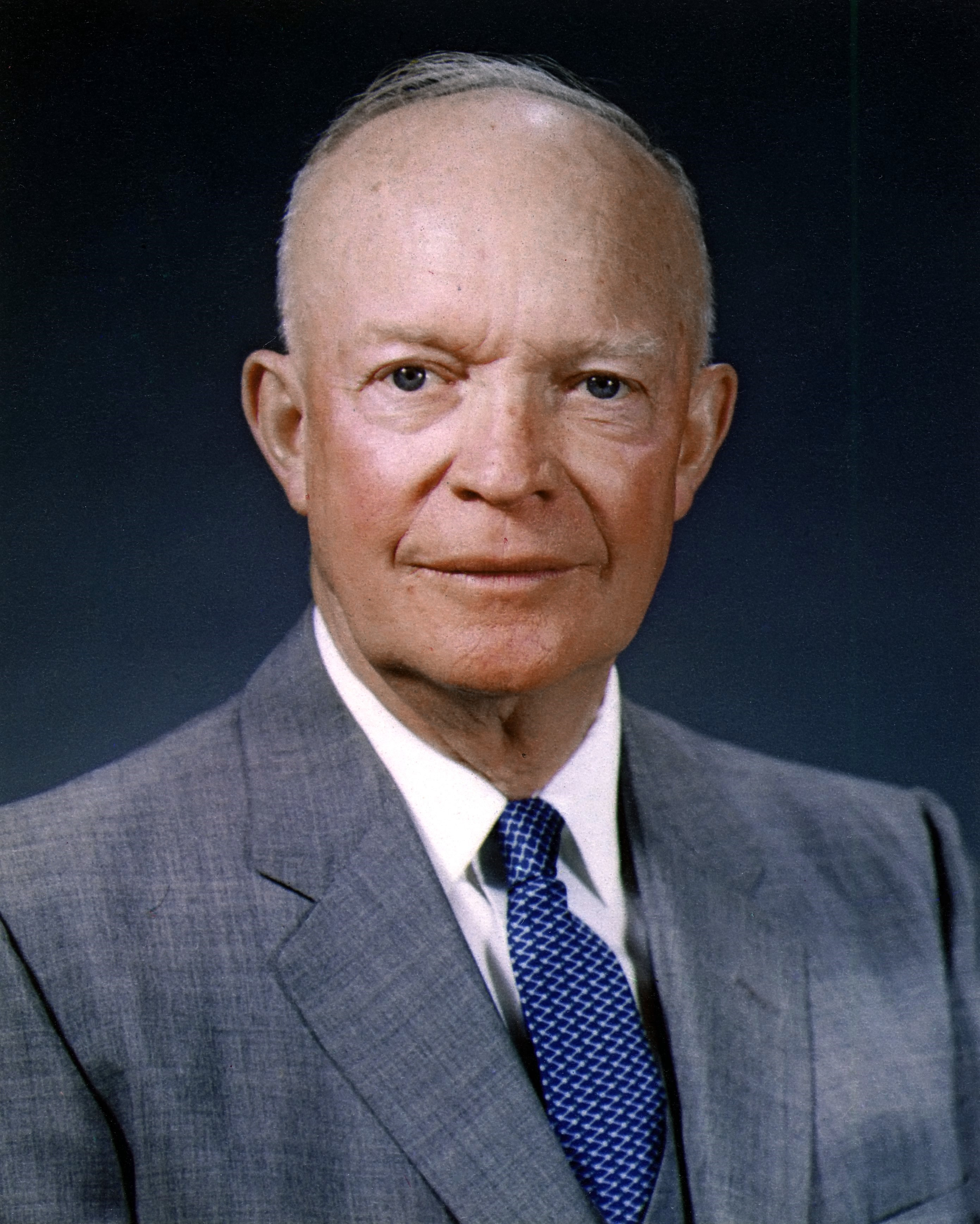
Dwight D. Eisenhower

Dwight D. Eisenhower was the commander of the Allied Expeditionary Force in Europe during World War II, and directed the 1944 Normandy invasion. After the war, he served as the Chief of Staff of the Army from 1945 to 1948. He was an extremely popular figure in the late 1940s, and he frequently topped the "most admired man" poll conducted by Gallup.

In the 1948 presidential election, despite numerous entreaties from organizations and prominent politicians, Eisenhower refused to enter the race, asserting that running for office was not appropriate for a military general. After the election, Eisenhower began to associate more closely with Republican politics, and in the lead-up to the 1952 election he faced renewed pressure to declare his candidacy as a Republican, though he remained reluctant. Irving Berlin included a song titled "They Like Ike" in the Broadway musical Call Me Madam, and a rally at Madison Square Garden featured thousands of Eisenhower supporters chanting "I like Ike". Various newspaper editors endorsed Eisenhower's presidential candidacy, and politicians from both the Democratic and Republican parties supported him.

In January 1952, Massachusetts senator Henry Cabot Lodge Jr. entered Eisenhower's name in the presidential primary in New Hampshire, angering Eisenhower; he won anyway. After his victory in New Hampshire and a narrow loss in Minnesota, he decided to join the presidential race. In July, the Republican National Convention nominated him for president, with Senator Richard Nixon as his running mate. They faced the Democratic presidential ticket of Adlai Stevenson II and John Sparkman.

=== Television advertising ===
By 1952, approximately 40 percent of Americans had a television, and the 1952 election was the first presidential election in which television played an important role. The Eisenhower campaign launched a series of television commercials titled "Eisenhower Answers America", the first spot ad campaign by an American presidential candidate. BBDO was responsible for handling the radio and television programming for Eisenhower's campaign. Total media expenditure for the election is estimated to range from $2 million (equivalent to $24.2 million in 2025) to over $6 million (equivalent to $72.7 million in 2025).

== Creation ==
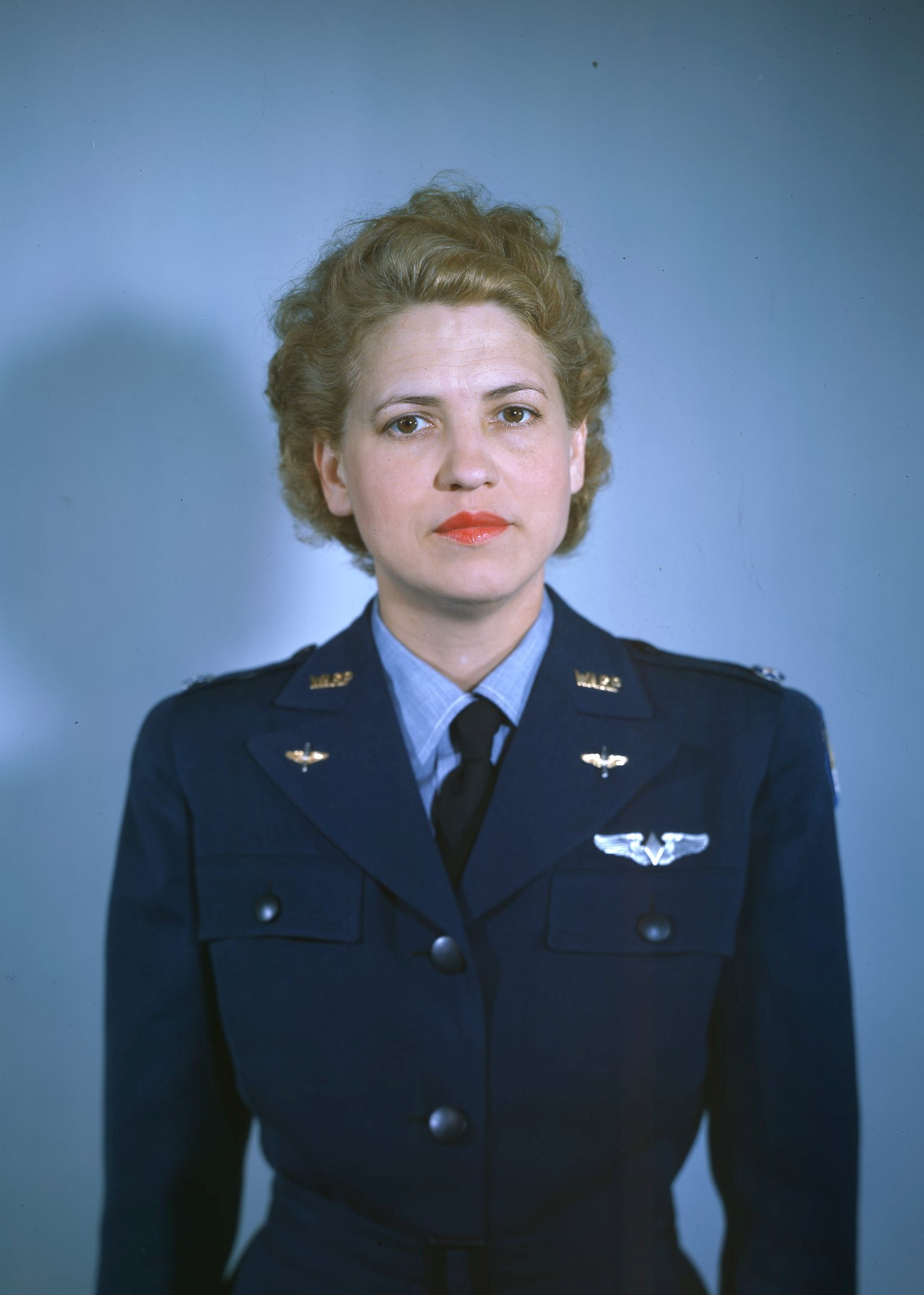
Jacqueline Cochran (pictured in 1943) coordinated the advertisement with the Walt Disney Company.

On September 30, 1952, Jacqueline Cochran, a pilot, cosmetic business executive, and one of Eisenhower's campaign aides, wrote to Roy O. Disney, co-founder of The Walt Disney Company, about a proposed advertisement which she had discussed with John Hay "Jock" Whitney. (Note: Jacqueline Cochran's husband, Floyd Odlum, was a director of the Disney corporation.) She speculated it could be "the greatest piece of propaganda in this whole campaign". Two days later, she wrote to artist George L. Carlson about the animated cartoon, which she called "We Like Ike." Calling it the "most extraordinary one minute short," she told him that many people, including Paul G. Hoffman and Paul Helms were impressed by the idea. Helms had donated $1,000 (equivalent to $12,100 in 2025) for production of the advertisement.

Because Disney was a union shop, its work rules prohibited any partisan political activity. The work for the advertisement was undertaken by unpaid volunteers outside working hours. Two animated spots were produced by the Disney Studio staff. Gil George and Paul Smith wrote the lyrics and the music. The advertisement, initially called "We'll Take Ike", is also known as "I Like Ike" and "Ike for President."

== Synopsis ==
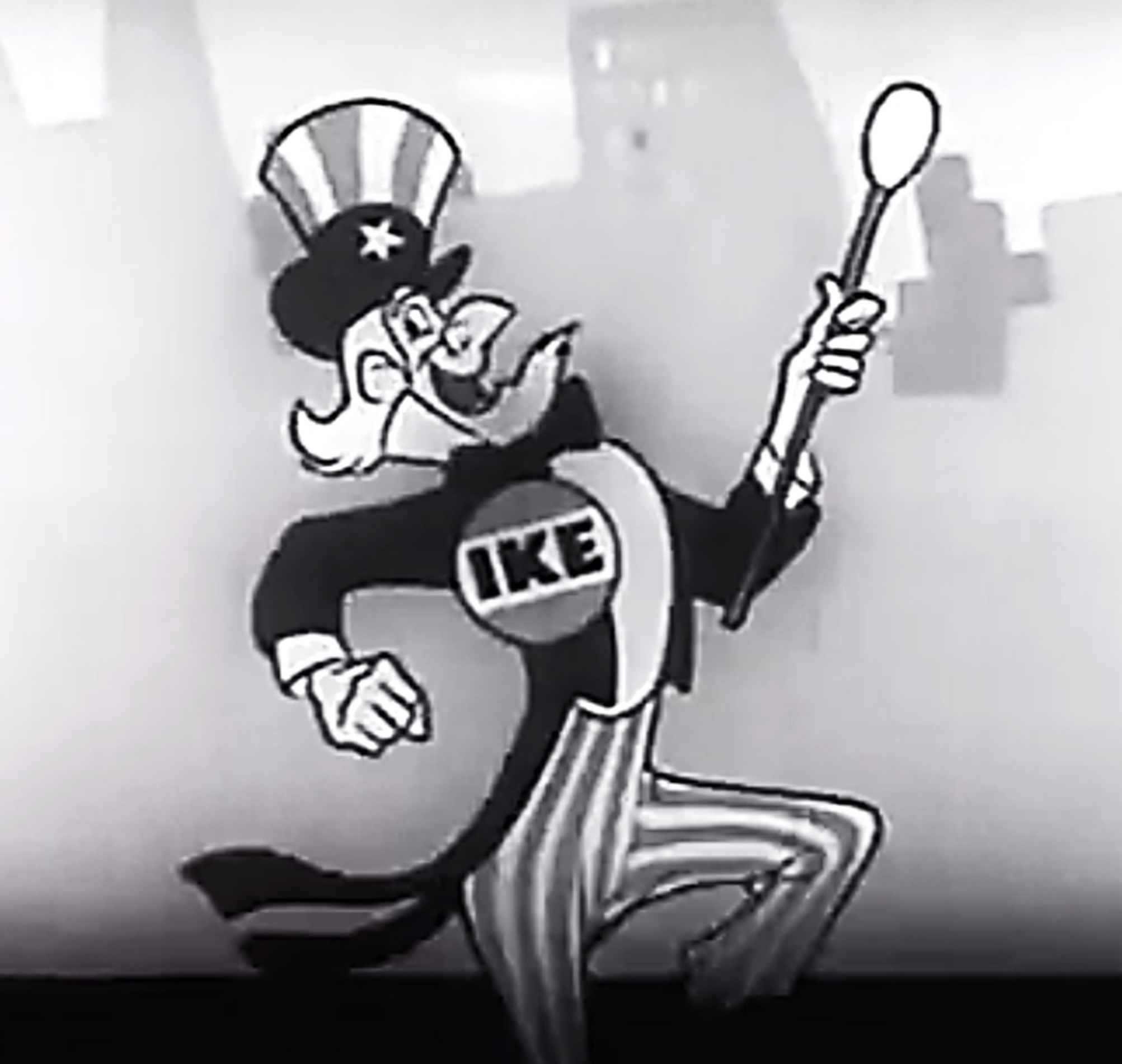
Uncle Sam as the drum major in "Ike for President"

The animated 60-second commercial begins with a bouncing Ike campaign button as music plays in the background. The clip segues to Uncle Sam as a drum major leading a circus elephant (representing the Republicans) who holds an Ike banner with his trunk. The elephant is wearing a caricature of Eisenhower around its body and beating a drum with its tail. Following the elephant is a large parade of various people, including farmers, painters, police officers, businessmen, chefs, firefighters, nurses, cowboys, bankers, pipe-fitters, teachers, and housewives, about whom author Eric Burns writes, they "...marched in exaggerated fashion with the goofiest of facial expressions". The ad then cuts to three donkeys (representing the Democrats). The music continues: "We don't want John or Dean or Harry / Let's do that big job right", referring to John Sparkman, Secretary of State Dean Acheson, and President Harry S. Truman. As the parade continues, an unidentified man rides a donkey in shadows towards the left. The music interposes: "Let Adlai go the other way / We'll all go with Ike". The Capitol building appears, festooned with an Ike banner. A close-up of the Capitol dome and the rising sun turns into an Ike campaign button. The narrator concludes: "Now is the time for all good Americans to come to the aid of their country."

== Analysis ==
The advertisement used name repetition as the core of its catchy jingle: the phrase "Ike for President" is repeated 19 times. Author Victor Kamber called "Ike for President" a positive advertisement. According to Thomas A. Hollihan, its purpose was to generate name recognition and communicate that "Eisenhower enjoyed the support of people of different socioeconomic means." Dennis W. Johnson said the main goal was to "drive home a consistent, simple message: 'I Like Ike'", remarking that it "has to be one of the best presidential slogans ever created". Paul Christiansen wrote that in "Ike for President", although Eisenhower's name receives a tonal emphasis, the word president is unstressed and is on the submediant and leading tone. He speculated that this emphasizes Eisenhower the man and implies that his personality is greater than the presidency. The musical jingle begins in D major but changes to F major; its tempo is constant at 120 beats per minute.

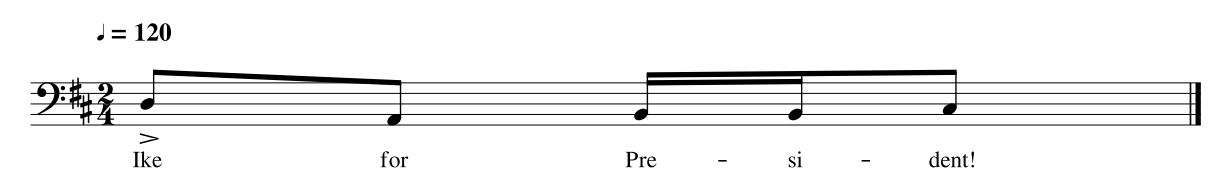

Christiansen contrasts "Ike for President" and the spiritual "All God's Chillun Got Wings"; he compares "You like Ike, I like Ike, everybody likes Ike" to "I got wings, you got wings, all God's chillun got wings". He refers to the narrator's closing sentence as a "party-transcending appeal to voters", and wrote:

... a vote for someone beside Eisenhower must be an antipatriotic betrayal. It is a call for all good Americans to come to the aid of 'their' party, after all. Good Americans belong to the Republican Party, it would seem. Voting for Eisenhower is presented here as a patriotic act that is for the good of the nation, leaving the converse proposition unspoken: are those voting for Stevenson unpatriotic?

== Aftermath ==
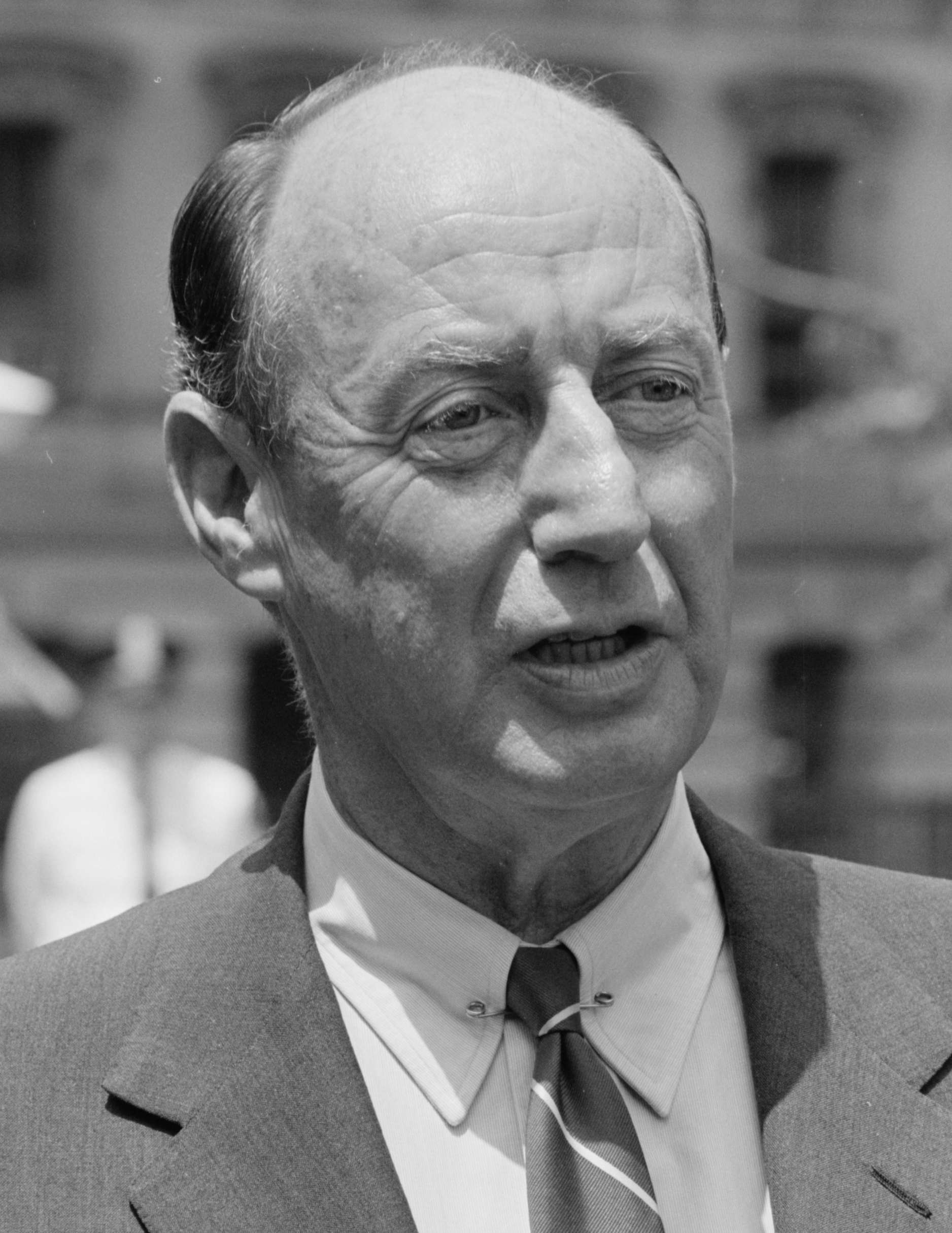
Adlai Stevenson II, the Democratic Party's presidential candidate

The "Ike for President" advertisement was sent to television stations in select American cities; the Eisenhower media plan was to broadcast it in targeted areas five to six times every night during the final two weeks of the campaign. Cochran paid over $2,700 (equivalent to $32,700 in 2025) to produce over 400 duplicates of the spot. The Eisenhower campaign created other commercials featuring Eisenhower's wife Mamie, which were considered an indirect attack against the divorced Stevenson. Reacting to the commercial, Stevenson said: "This isn't Ivory Soap versus Palmolive". Later, he called "Ike for President" the worst thing he ever heard, and said that Eisenhower is "selling the presidency like cereal ... How can you talk seriously about issues with one-minute spots?" Stevenson's campaign spent 95 percent of its television budget on broadcasting his 30-minute speeches. Although the speeches attracted a huge audience, authors Edwin Diamond and Stephen Bates speculated that most Stevenson viewers were already committed to voting for him. The Stevenson campaign created the "I Love the Gov" advertisement in response to "Ike for President".

Eisenhower won the election with 55.2% of the popular vote, defeating Stevenson by a margin of 353 electoral votes. Rosser Reeves, the advertising expert of the Eisenhower campaign, later said, the election "...was such a landslide that (the commercial) didn't make a goddamn bit of difference". Roy O. Disney wrote to Cochran ten days after the election, saying that the "boys and girls all enjoyed working on the project and, of course, we are all very happy at the outcome of the election". Time magazine ranked "Ike for President" eighth in its list of the top ten campaign advertisements.

== See also ==
- Checkers speech

== Works cited ==
=== Books ===
- Ambrose, Stephen E. (1983). Eisenhower. Vol. One. Simon & Schuster. ISBN 978-0-671-44069-5. LCCN 83009892. OL 3167850M – via the Internet Archive.
- Burns, Eric (2010). Invasion of the Mind Snatchers – Television's Conquest of America in the Fifties. Temple University Press. ISBN 978-1-4399-0290-5 – via Google Books.
- Burton, Michael John; Shea, Daniel M. (2010). Campaign Craft: The Strategies, Tactics, and Art of Political Campaign Management – The Strategies, Tactics, and Art of Political Campaign Management (2nd ed.). ABC-CLIO. ISBN 978-0-313-38344-1 – via Google Books.
- Busch, Andrew (2012). Truman's Triumphs – The 1948 Election and the Making of Postwar America. University Press of Kansas. ISBN 978-0-7006-1866-8. LCCN 2012020593. OL 26379614M – via the Internet Archive.
- Diamond, Edwin; Bates, Stephen (1992). The Spot – The Rise of Political Advertising on Television. MIT Press. ISBN 978-0-262-54065-0 – via Google Books.
- Hollihan, Thomas A. (2009). Uncivil Wars: Political Campaigns in a Media Age. St. Martin's Press. ISBN 978-0-312-47883-4 – via the Internet Archive.
- Johnson, Dennis W. (2017). Democracy for Hire – A History of American Political Consulting. Oxford University Press. ISBN 978-0-19-027269-2 – via Google Books.
- Kamber, Victor (2003). Poison Politics: Are Negative Campaigns Destroying Democracy?. Perseus Books Group. ISBN 978-0-7382-0872-5 – via the Internet Archive.
- Pach, Chester J., ed. (2017). A Companion to Dwight D. Eisenhower. Wiley. ISBN 978-1-119-02733-1 – via Google Books.
- Pickett, William B. (2000). Eisenhower Decides to Run: Presidential Politics and Cold War Strategy. Ivan R. Dee. ISBN 978-1-56663-325-3 – via the Internet Archive.
- Pusey, Merlo J. (1956). Eisenhower – The President. Macmillan Publishers – via the Internet Archive.
- Rumbough, Stanley M. Jr. (2013). Citizens for Eisenhower. International Publishers. ISBN 978-0-615-86355-9 – via the Internet Archive.
- Guide to U.S. Elections (6th ed.). SAGE Publications. 2010. ISBN 978-1-60426-536-1. LCCN 2009033938.
- Voss, Frederick (2008). Packaging Presidents: 200 Years of Campaigns & Candidates. Abraham Lincoln Presidential Library Foundation. ISBN 978-0-9799182-1-6 – via the Internet Archive.

=== Journals and articles ===
- Christiansen, Paul (2018). "The Age of Innocence: 1952". Orchestrating Public Opinion: How Music Persuades in Television Political Ads for US Presidential Campaigns, 1952–2016. Amsterdam University Press. pp. 31–41. ISBN 978-94-6298-188-1. JSTOR j.ctv8pzcv5.5.
- Christiansen, Paul (2018). "Still Liking Ike: 1956". Orchestrating Public Opinion: How Music Persuades in Television Political Ads for US Presidential Campaigns, 1952–2016. Amsterdam University Press. pp. 42–46. ISBN 978-94-6298-188-1. JSTOR j.ctv8pzcv5.6.
- Daniel, Douglass K. (2000). "They Liked Ike: Pro-Eisenhower Publishers and His Decision to Run for President". Journalism & Mass Communication Quarterly. 77 (2). Association for Education in Journalism and Mass Communication: 393–404. doi:10.1177/107769900007700211. ISSN 1077-6990. S2CID 144712540.
- Lawrence, W. H. (June 12, 1952). "Eisenhower Nominated on the First Ballot; Senator Nixon Chosen as His Running Mate; General Pledges 'Total Victory' Crusade". The New York Times. Archived from the original on February 24, 2021.
- Morris, Kenneth E.; Schwartz, Barry (1993). "Why They Liked Ike – Tradition, Crisis, and Heroic Leadership". The Sociological Quarterly. 34 (1). Midwest Sociological Society: 131–151. doi:10.1111/j.1533-8525.1993.tb00134.x. JSTOR 4121562.
- Smith, Tom W. (1986). "The Polls: The Most Admired Man and Woman". Public Opinion Quarterly. 50 (4). American Association for Public Opinion Research: 573–577. doi:10.1086/269005. JSTOR 2748760.
- Whitney, Gleaves (2005). "Eisenhower and D-Day". Hauenstein Center for Presidential Studies.
- Wood, Stephen C. (1990). "Television's First Political Spot Ad Campaign: Eisenhower Answers America". Presidential Studies Quarterly. 20 (2). Wiley: 265–283. JSTOR 27550614.
- "Jacqueline Cochran and the Women's Airforce Service Pilots (WASPs)". Dwight D. Eisenhower Presidential Library, Museum and Boyhood Home.
