= Robert Parmet =

American professor (1938–2026)

- Born: Robert David Parmet; December 11, 1938; New York City, U.S.
- Died: November 6, 2026 (aged 87)
- Education: Columbia University
- Occupation: Academic
- Years active: 1961–2025
- Employer: York College, City University of New York
- Spouse: Joan Levy (m. 1963)
- Children: 1
- Relatives: Herbert Parmet (brother)

Robert David Parmet (December 11, 1938 – November 6, 2026) was an American writer and teacher. He was a professor of history at York College, City University of New York.

== Early life and education ==
Parmet was born in New York City on December 11, 1938. He was the son of Isaac Parmet and Fannie (née Scharf), and was the brother of American historian Herbert Parmet.

He received a B.A. (1960) from City College, and M.A. (1961) and Ph.D. (1966) degrees from Columbia University. He taught at City College while attending Graduate School. His master's thesis, "Cleveland, Blaine, and New York's Irish in the election of 1884," was written under the supervision of John A. Garraty. His doctoral dissertation, "The Know-Nothings in Connecticut," was written under the supervision of Eric McKitrick.

== Career ==
Parmet taught at Newark State College (now known as Kean University) from 1965 to 1967 in the Social Science Department, and was employed at CUNY York, having worked there since its opening in 1967. He has written four books on American social history from 1961 to 2012. Additionally he has written for many papers such as the History News Network, United Press International, and International Labor and Working-Class History under the Cambridge University Press.

He wrote extensively about labor and unions in 20th-century America, including those of women, immigrants, and of David Dubinsky. In 1968, he received a $2,000 grant ($18,234.20 USD in 2024) to write a biography on American senator Chauncey Depew. It was published in 1970.

Parmet retired from full-time teaching at York College in Spring 2025 after 57 years.

== Personal life and death ==
Parmet was married to Joan Levy on June 8, 1963. She received her Masters in History from Columbia University in 1965. They had a son.

Parmet died on November 6, 2026, at the age of 87.

== Bibliography ==
=== Books ===
- Leonard, Ira M.; Parmet, Robert D. (1971). American Nativism, 1830-1860. Van Nostrand Reinhold. ISBN 978-0-44278-188-0.
- Parmet, Robert D. (1981). Labor and Immigration in Industrial America. Twayne Publishers. ISBN 978-0-80578-418-3.
- Parmet, Robert D. (2005). The Master of Seventh Avenue: David Dubinsky and the American Labor Movement. NYU Press. ISBN 978-0-8147-6711-5.
- Parmet, Robert D. (2011-11-24). Town and Gown: The Fight for Social Justice, Urban Rebirth, and Higher Education. Lexington Books. ISBN 978-1-61147-473-2.

=== Papers ===
- Parmet, Robert D. (1966). "Connecticut's Know-Nothings: A Profile." Connecticut Historical Society Bulletin 31 (3): 84–90.
- Parmet, Robert D. (1970). "The Presidential Fever of Chauncey Depew." New York Historical Society Quarterly 54 (3): 268-290.
- Parmet, Robert D. (1971). "Schools for the Freedmen". Negro History Bulletin. 34 (6): 128–132. ISSN 0028-2529. JSTOR 24766513.
- Parmet, Robert D. (1972). "Competition for the World's Columbian Exposition: The New York Campaign". Journal of the Illinois State Historical Society. 65 (4): 365–381. ISSN 0019-2287. JSTOR 40191202.
- Parmet, Robert D. (1982). "Labor and Immigration in Industrial America. (Immigrant Heritage of America Series.)". The American Historical Review. 87 (4). doi:10.1086/ahr/87.4.1177. ISSN 1937-5239.
- Parmet, Robert D.; Papanikolas, Zeese (1983). "Buried Unsung: Louis Tikas and the Ludlow Massacre". The Journal of American History. 70 (1): 176. doi:10.2307/1890597. JSTOR 1890597.
- Parmet, Robert D. (1985). "Capeci, Dominic J., Jr. Race Relations in Wartime Detroit: The Sojourner Truth Housing Controversy of 1942". Urban History Review. 14 (1): 86–87. doi:10.7202/1017898ar. ISSN 0703-0428.
- Parmet, Robert D. (1988). "Fishman, Robert. Bourgeois Utopias: The Rise and Fall of Suburbia. Gale, Dennis E. Washington, D.C.: Inner-City Revitalization and Minority Suburbanization". Urban History Review. 17 (2): 136–137. doi:10.7202/1017672ar. ISSN 0703-0428.
- Parmet, Robert D.; Marks, Gary (1990). "Unions in Politics: Britain, Germany, and the United States in the Nineteenth and Early Twentieth Centuries". The Journal of American History. 77 (2): 691. doi:10.2307/2079272. JSTOR 2079272.
- Parmet, Robert D. (1999). "Peter Kwong, Forbidden Workers: Illegal Chinese Immigrants and American Labor". International Labor and Working-Class History. 56: 175–177. doi:10.1017/S0147547999452883.
- Parmet, Robert D. (2018). "Clarence Irving and the Rediscovery of Black America". CUNY Academic Works.
