= Fred Greenstein =

American political scientist

Fred Irwin Greenstein (September 1, 1930 – December 3, 2018) was an American political scientist, known for his work on political leadership and the US presidency.

Born in the Bronx, New York City, in 1930, Greenstein completed a bachelor's degree at Antioch College in 1953 and a doctorate at Yale University in 1960. He began his teaching career at Yale in 1959, was a professor at Wesleyan University from 1962 to 1973, and then moved to Princeton University, where he served for the rest of his career.

Greenstein published many books and journal articles. His book The Hidden-Hand Presidency changed the way many scholars viewed the Eisenhower presidency and received the Louis Brownlow Award in 1983 from the National Academy of Public Administration. How Presidents Test Reality received the 1990 Richard E. Neustadt Award from the American Political Science Association. Greenstein received a Guggenheim fellowship in 1976, was named a fellow of the American Academy of Arts and Sciences the same year, and served as president of the International Society of Political Psychology from 1996 to 1997. Greenstein retired from Princeton in 2001, and died at his home in Princeton, New Jersey, in 2018, aged 88.

Greenstein's major books included:

- The American Party System and the American People (1963)
- Children and Politics (1965)
- Personality and Politics: Problems of Evidence, Inference, and Conceptualization (1969)
- The Handbook of Political Science (1975) (editor, with Nelson W. Polsby)
- The Hidden-Hand Presidency: Eisenhower as Leader (1982)
- How Presidents Test Reality: Decisions on Vietnam, 1954 and 1965 (1989) (with John Burke)
- The Presidential Difference: Leadership Style from FDR to Clinton (2000)
- Inventing the Job of President: Leadership Style from George Washington to Andrew Jackson (2009)
