= William B. Pickett =

American historian and professor, born 1940

- Born: William Beatty Pickett; March 12, 1940 (age 86); Crawfordsville, Indiana, U.S.
- Board member of: Indiana Association of Historians, Indiana Council for History Education
- Awards: Fulbright Fellowship (1989)

Academic background
- Education: Carleton College; Indiana University Bloomington
- Thesis: Homer E. Capehart: The Making of a Hoosier Senator (1974)

Academic work
- Discipline: Historian
- Sub-discipline: U.S. political and military history, Indiana history, Dwight D. Eisenhower, Homer E. Capehart, history of the Internet
- Institutions: Rose-Hulman Institute of Technology
- Notable works: Dwight David Eisenhower and American Power, Eisenhower Decides To Run: Presidential Politics and Cold War Strategy

William Beatty Pickett (born March 12, 1940) is an American historian and professor emeritus at Rose-Hulman Institute of Technology in Terre Haute, Indiana. He is known as an authority on President Dwight D. Eisenhower and Indiana Senator Homer E. Capehart, and is the author of several well-regarded books on U.S. history including Dwight David Eisenhower and American Power and Eisenhower Decides To Run: Presidential Politics and Cold War Strategy.

== Early life ==
Pickett was born in Crawfordsville, Indiana. He earned his bachelor's degree at Carleton College in Northfield, Minnesota in 1962, and both a master's degree (in 1968) and doctorate (in 1974) at Indiana University Bloomington. He served as a lieutenant in the United States Naval Reserve from 1962 to 1966.

== Academic career ==
After postgraduate work at Indiana University in the late 1960s, Pickett was a professor of history at Rose-Hulman for 35 years. He was a Fulbright Scholar at Nanzan University in Nagoya, Japan in 1989–90, lecturing on American history, and taught American history on U.S. military bases in Korea as a visiting professor for the University of Maryland. He was an educational consultant to the American University of Kyrgyzstan (now called American University of Central Asia) in 2002. In 1992–93, he served as president of the Indiana Association of Historians. In 2006, he co-founded the Web History Center, a hub for archiving and preserving early Internet history, with branches in Indiana at Rose-Hulman and at California's Computer History Museum. Two of his lectures about Eisenhower were featured on C-SPAN's Book TV series in 2000 and 2002. Since 2016, he has been a member of the historical advisory panel for the Eisenhower Memorial in Washington, D.C. Pickett retired from teaching in 2007 but continues to write.

=== Published works ===
Over the course of his career, Pickett produced a number of books, journal articles, reviews, and oral histories. Pickett wrote his doctoral thesis on Indiana Sen. Homer Capehart, and his 1990 book Homer E. Capehart: A Senator's Life was the first scholarly biography of the politician. Homer E. Capehart won an Award of Merit from the Ohio Museums Association in 1990. Pickett's work on Eisenhower included two full-length books. Reviewer Lawrence S. Conner called 1995's Dwight David Eisenhower and American Power a "concise and readable" work that helped to revise previous historians' "harsh assessments of Eisenhower." Writing in Presidential Studies Quarterly, Herbert Parmet called the book a "gracefully written," more contemporary view of Eisenhower as a politician who "understood and moved with the rhythms of history." Pickett's 2000 book Eisenhower Decides to Run was one of the first scholarly looks at the 1952 presidential campaign, and focused particularly on Eisenhower's political reputation. Writing for Michigan State University's H-Net forum, Steven Wagner called the book "required reading for Eisenhower specialists" that helped to overturn the older consensus that Eisenhower was only a passive player in his own political career, and made the case that long-simmering political ambitions led to his consciously seeking the presidency in order to block the ambitions of Ohio Senator Robert A. Taft. Reviewer Thomas R. Maddux wrote that Pickett's book challenged the "standard view advanced by Stephen Ambrose and others" that Eisenhower was a reluctant candidate, positing instead that Eisenhower was cautious after witnessing the controversial political rise of his military rival Douglas MacArthur, and was a more skilled behind-the-scenes leader than generally acknowledged.

Pickett also conducted several collections of oral interviews on Capehart and the histories of Terre Haute and surrounding Vigo County and Rose-Hulman.

== Selected publications ==
External videos
- Pickett discusses Eisenhower Decides to Run at the Eisenhower Presidential Library, October 26, 2000, C-SPAN
- Pickett speaks on the topic "Eisenhower as a Historical Figure" at Gettysburg College, October 26, 2002, C-SPAN

=== Books ===
- Pickett, William B. (2000). Eisenhower Decides To Run: Presidential Politics and Cold War Strategy. Chicago: Ivan R. Dee. ISBN 1-56-663787-2. OCLC 43953970.
- Pickett, William B. (1999). To Be the Best: Rose-Hulman Institute of Technology 1974-1999. Louisville: Four Colour Imports. ISBN 0-91-441401-1. OCLC 42520799.
- Pickett, William B. (1995). Dwight David Eisenhower and American Power. Wheeling, Ill.: Harlan Davidson. ISBN 0-88-295918-2. OCLC 31206927.
- Pickett, William B. (1990). Homer E. Capehart: A Senator's Life, 1897-1979. Indianapolis: Indiana Historical Society. ISBN 0-87-195054-5. OCLC 22182601.
- Pickett, William B. (1984). Vigo County Interim Report: Indiana Historical Sites and Structures Inventory. Indianapolis: Historic Landmarks Foundation of Indiana.
- Pickett, William B., ed. (1977). Technology at the Turning Point. San Francisco: San Francisco Press. ISBN 0-91-130236-0. OCLC 5133913.

=== Journal articles and short works ===
- Pickett, William B. (2007). "Eisenhower, Khrushchev, and the U-2 Affair: A Forty-six Year Retrospective". In Clifford, J. Garry; Wilson, Theodore A. (eds.). Presidents, Diplomats, and Other Mortals: Essays Honoring Robert H. Ferrell. Columbia, Missouri: University of Missouri Press. pp. 137–153. ISBN 978-0-8262-1747-9.
- Pickett, William B. (2006). "Dwight D. Eisenhower: His Legacy in World Affairs". In Dean, Virgil W. (ed.). John Brown to Bob Dole: Movers and Shakers in Kansas History. Lawrence, Kans.: University Press of Kansas. ISBN 0-7006-1429-X.
- Pickett, William B. "New Look or Containment? George F. Kennan and the Making of Republican National Security Strategy" (September 2005). George F. Kennan Papers 1861-2014 (mostly 1950-2000), Box: Box 172, Folder 6. Department of Rare Books and Special Collections, Princeton University.
- Pickett, William B. (2004). George F. Kennan and the Origins of Eisenhower's New Look: An Oral History of Project Solarium (PDF). Princeton, New Jersey: Princeton Institute for International and Regional Studies, Princeton University. OCLC 55497101. Archived from the original (PDF) on October 29, 2013.
- Pickett, William B. (September 2004). "The Firebombing of the Terre Haute Holocaust Museum: A Hoosier Community Responds to an Assault on Collective Memory". Indiana Magazine of History. 100 (3): 243–257. JSTOR 27792557.
- Pickett, William B. (2003). "General Andrew Jackson Goodpaster: Managing National Security". In Anderson, David L. (ed.). The Human Tradition in America Since 1945. Wilmington, Delaware: SR Books. pp. 25–46. ISBN 978-0842029438.
- Pickett, William B. (June 2002). "Liberal Education: Its Goals and Methods". Bulletin of the American University of Kyrgyzstan: 5–7.
- Pickett, William B. (January 2000). "Eisenhower, Dwight D. (1890–1969)". In Chambers, John Whiteclay (ed.). The Oxford Companion to American Military History. Oxford, United Kingdom: Oxford University Press. ISBN 9780195071986.
- Pickett, William B. (1999). "Homer Earl Capehart". In Garraty, John A.; Carnes, Mark C. (eds.). American National Biography. New York: Oxford University Press. doi:10.1093/anb/9780198606697.article.0700585.
- Pickett, William B. (Fall 1992). "The Historiography of American Foreign Policy". Organization of American Historians. OAH Magazine of History. 7 (2). Oxford University Press: 13–15. doi:10.1093/maghis/7.2.13. JSTOR 25162869.
- Pickett, William B. (1992). "Vietnam, 1964-1973: An American Dilemma". The Journal of Military History. 56 (1): 113. doi:10.2307/1985713. JSTOR 1985713.
- Pickett, William B. (June 1985). "The Eisenhower Solarium Notes". The SHAFR Newsletter. 16. Society for Historians of American Foreign Relations: 1–10.

=== Oral histories ===
- Pickett, William B. Biography: Homer E. Capehart, 1969-1973. Bloomington, Indiana: Indiana University Center for Documentary Research and Practice, Indiana University Center for History and Memory. ohrc015.
- Pickett, William B. (chairman). Vigo County Oral History Program (1980-81). Terre Haute, Indiana: Collections: Politics and Government, Vigo County Public Library. 820128A.
- Pickett, William B. (1997–1998). "Oral History Interviews". Rose-Hulman Institute of Technology Archives & Special Collections.
