= William I. Hitchcock =

American historian

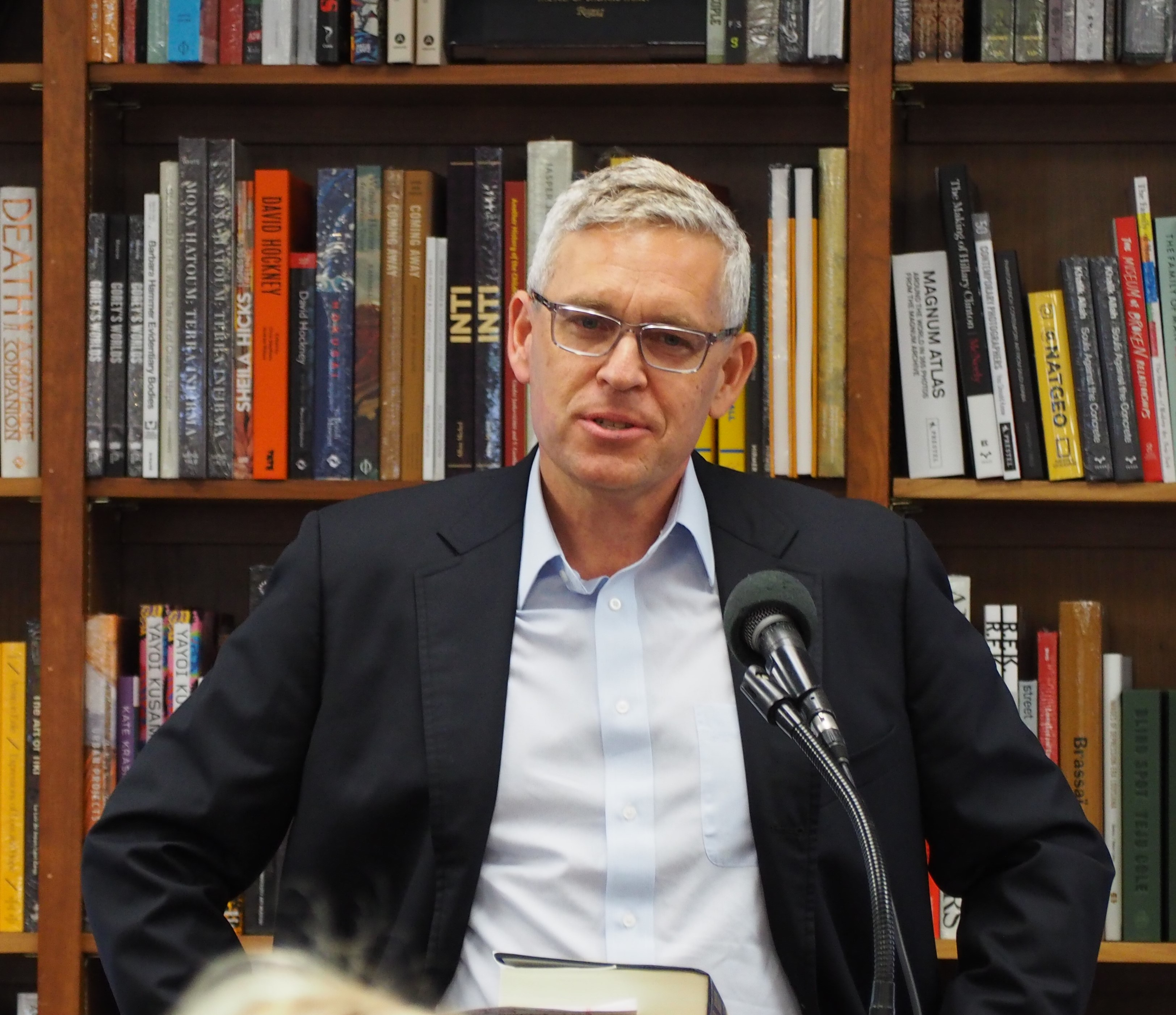
- Education: Kenyon College (BA); Yale University (PhD)
- Employer: University of Virginia
- Spouse: Elizabeth R. Varon
- Children: 2

William I. Hitchcock is the James Madison Professor of History at the University of Virginia. His work focuses on the history of the 20th century with a special interest on the two world wars and cold war era. Professor Hitchcock is best known for his book The Bitter Road to Freedom, which was a finalist for the 2009 Pulitzer Prize in General Non-Fiction, and his New York Times bestseller, The Age of Eisenhower.

== Early life and education ==
William I. Hitchcock was born in Fukuoka, Japan in 1965 to a U.S. Foreign Service Officer and later lived overseas in Tokyo, Tel Aviv, and Paris. He received a bachelor's degree from Kenyon College in 1986 and a Ph.D. in history from Yale University in 1994 under the historian Paul Kennedy.

== Academic career ==
He began his career at Yale University, where he taught for six years and served as Associate Director of International Security Studies. In 1999, he joined Wellesley College, where he taught for five years. He later served as Professor of History and Dean at Temple University. In 2010, he joined the University of Virginia, serving as the James Madison Professor of History and Director of the Governing America in a Global Era (GAGE) Initiative.

== Scholarship and Recognition ==
Hitchcock's third main book, The Bitter Road to Freedom: A New History of the Liberation of Europe (2008), was a finalist for the 2009 Pulitzer Prize for General Nonfiction and won the George Louis Beer Prize from the American Historical Association. Later, his 2018 book, The Age of Eisenhower: America and the World in the 1950s, became a New York Times bestseller. Additionally, in 2026, he published another book, A Shadow Over the World: Franklin D. Roosevelt, the Rise of Fascism, and the Making of America's World War II.

Aside from authoring a variety of books, Hitchcock has been recognized for many other contributions. He was named a Fulbright Scholar, a Fellow of the Nobel Institute in Oslo, the holder of the Henry Kissinger Chair at the Library of Congress, and a Fellow at the American Academy in Berlin.

== Personal life ==
Hitchcock lives in Charlottesville, Virginia, and is married to historian Elizabeth R. Varon.

== Books ==
- France Restored: Cold War Diplomacy and the Quest for Stability in Europe, 1945-1954, Chapel Hill, NC: University of North Carolina Press, 1998. ISBN 9780807847473, OCLC 704414945
- From War to Peace: Altered Strategic Landscapes in the Twentieth Century. Co-edited with Paul Kennedy, New Haven: Yale University Press, 2000. ISBN 9780385497992, OCLC 54934490
- The Struggle for Europe: The Turbulent History of a Divided Continent, 1945-present New York: Doubleday, 2003; London, Profile Books, 2003 ISBN 9781861972330, OCLC 59364294; Anchor Books paperback, 2004).
- The Bitter Road to Freedom: A New History of the Liberation of Europe. New York: The Free Press/Simon and Schuster, 2008. ISBN 0743273818, OCLC 191024097; Published simultaneously in Britain by Faber and Co., London. 2009 Pulitzer Prize finalist in General Nonfiction.
- The Human Rights Revolution: An International History, co-edited with Akira Iriye and Petra Goedde. New York: Oxford University Press, 2012. ISBN 9780195333138, OCLC 833113839
- The Age of Eisenhower: America and the World in the 1950s. New York: Simon & Schuster, 2018. ISBN 9781439175668, OCLC 989124126
- A Shadow Over the World: Franklin D. Roosevelt, the Rise of Fascism, and the Making of America's World War II. New York: Simon & Schuster, 2026. ISBN 9781982157722
