= Herbert Parmet =

American writer and historian (1929–2017)

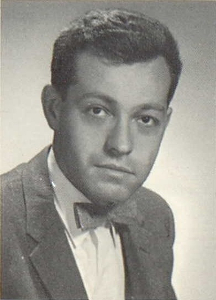
- Born: Herbert Samuel Parmet; August 28, 1929; New York City, New York, United States
- Died: 25 January 2017 (aged 87); Newton, Massachusetts
- Occupation: Historian
- Known for: Political writing and presidential biographies
- Spouse: Joan Kronish
- Relatives: Robert Parmet (Brother)

Herbert Samuel Parmet (Stylized as Herbert S. Parmet) (September 28, 1929 – January 25, 2017) was an American writer, biographer, and distinguished historian most notable for his works of writing on American presidents.

== Early life ==
Herbert Parmet, who was named for American president Herbert Hoover, was born in New York City to Isaac Parmet and Fanny Scharf, two Jewish immigrants from Eastern Europe, with his father being from the Ukrainian city of Krasyliv, and his mother from the village of Wiśnicz in Poland. He grew up in the Bronx with his parents and his younger brother Robert, the latter of which has taught history at CUNY's York College from its opening in 1967 until 2025.

== Formative years ==
Herbert went to DeWitt Clinton High School in New York City, where he met his wife, Joan Kronish. Parmet and Kronish would marry in August 1948, and would go on to attend the State University of New York at Oswego together. After receiving his B.A. (1951), he served in the U.S. Army from 1952 to 1954, before attending Queens College, from which he received an M.A. in history (1957). Although he went on to pursue doctoral studies at Columbia University from 1957 to 1962, he never completed his Ph.D.

He taught social studies in North Babylon, Long Island (1951–1954); at Mineola High School in Mineola, Long Island (1954–1968), where he was chairman of the department of social studies from 1961 to 1968; before moving to Queensborough Community College in Bayside, Queens, where he was an assistant professor (1968–1973), associate professor (1973–1975), professor (1975–1983), and then distinguished professor (1983–1995) of history. Upon his retirement, he was named distinguished professor emeritus of history (1995–2017). He was also on the faculty of the CUNY Graduate Center beginning in 1977.

While working as a teacher, he co-authored his first book, Aaron Burr; Portrait of an Ambitious Man with colleague Marie Hecht.

== Writing career ==
In total, Parmet would author and co-author a total of 11 books throughout his vocation, mostly regarding politics and the lives of American presidents such as John F Kennedy and Richard Nixon.

- Parmet, Herbert; Hecht, Marie (1967). Aaron Burr; Portrait of an Ambitious Man. Macmillan. ISBN 9140111563.
- Parmet, Herbert; Hecht, Marie (1968). Never Again; a President Runs for a Third Term.
- Parmet, Herbert (1972). Eisenhower and the American Crusades. Macmillan. ISBN 9781138522732.
- Parmet, Herbert (1976). The Democrats: The Years After FDR. Oxford University Press. ISBN 9780195199710.
- Parmet, Herbert (1983). JFK, the Presidency of John F. Kennedy. Dial Press. ISBN 9780385274197.
- Parmet, Herbert (1983). Jack: The Struggles of John F. Kennedy. Doubleday Publishing. ISBN 9780385278027.
- Parmet, Herbert (1984). 200 Years of Looking Ahead: Commemorating the Bicentennial of the Founding of the Bank of New York, 1784-1984. History Associates.
- Parmet, Herbert (1990). Richard Nixon and His America. Random House Value Publishing. ISBN 9780517079744.
- Parmet, Herbert (1997). George Bush: The Life of a Lone Star Yankee. Easton Press. ISBN 9781412824521.
- Parmet, Herbert (2002). Presidential Power from the New Deal to the New Right. Krieger Publishing. ISBN 9780894648373.
- Parmet, Herbert (2008). Richard M. Nixon: An American Enigma. Pearson Longman. ISBN 9780321398932.

== Political opinions ==
Herbert Parmet thought very highly of former president Richard Nixon, saying in an interview with the Great Falls Tribune, "I think it is very important to see him as the very sensitive, intelligent human being that he is.", although admitted in the past he was not a fan of Nixon. In defense of Nixon, he also discussed with the Associated Press, in a response to the development of Oliver Stone's movie, Nixon, that the film was "Absolute, total, and utter nonsense." and that "I guess they waited until he died to come out with this nonsense." in referring to early drafts of the movie regarding a subplot of Nixon organizing a hit squad to assassinate John F. Kennedy.

The author also had high opinions regarding former president Bill Clinton, telling the Californian that "I would place Clinton definitely above average; I'm very comfortable with that." He was against the process of the impeachment of Bill Clinton, saying the process "...[gave] the impression of a partisan ganging up on a president by individuals who loathed him from the beginning."

Parmet, in an interview with Sheldon Stern, stressed that in regards to his extensive interviews of both Eisenhower and Kennedy associates that, in the case of Eisenhower, "...were more concerned with the conservative mission than the Kennedy people were, rather than with the personality of the man." and that "the Kennedy people, by and large, display a temperamental kind of intellectual liberalism, both temperamental and intellectually.", explaining further that in his interviews, they didn't focus on the policy and other political aspects of Kennedy, in comparison to the time they spent talking about the personality of the former president himself.

With reference to the presidency of Dwight D Eisenhower, his writings on the topic describe him as a stabilizing influence of necessity, to say "to label him a great or good or even weak president misses the point. He was merely necessary."

== Personal life and death ==
Herbert Parmet has a daughter, Wendy. She holds a joint appointment at Northeastern University as Matthews Distinguished University Professor of Law and Director of the Center for Health Policy and Law, and Professor of Public Policy and Urban Affairs in the School of Public Policy and Urban Affairs.

He died on January 25, 2017, in the city of Newton, Massachusetts.

== Reception of writings ==
On his debut book on Aaron Burr, the Bridgeport Post very highly reviewed and recommended the work of Parmet and Hecht remarking, "This is scholars' work, no doubt of that... anyone with a casual interest in biography or American history will find much to interest in him in this exhaustive, though never exhausting, well-written biography." The Freeport Journal-Standard had opinions in congruence with the Post, declaring that the book was a "fiery story, engrossingly told." The Kansas City Times called it a "fascinating study of a genuine character."

Glen Macnow of the Detroit Free Press described Parmet in his writings about Kennedy as someone that "...remains detached from the Kennedy mystique, portraying the man as neither a hero of Camelot nor a woman-chasing scoundrel." and that "Above all, Parmet avoids romanticizing JFK." Despite Macnow's approval of his impartiality in his work on Kennedy, the St. Louis-Post Dispatch articulates that "Parmet does not mention, as he should have, that Kennedy's appointment of reactionary Southerners to the federal bench caused problems that continued for years."

Jack Lessenberry of the Commercial Appeal described his series on Nixon as "...by far, the best, mainly because it is not just about Nixon, but about the land that shaped him; that is to say, our America. Echoing Macnow's opinion regarding Parmet's neutrality in writing, Alan Miller from the Atlanta Constitution wrote, "...[Parmet] places Mr. Nixon squarely in the context of his turbulent times. This useful perspective allows readers to draw their own conclusions about the man who still evokes fierce passions." Lessenberry and Miller's praise of Herbert's work on Nixon is heavily contrasted to that of Judith Johnson from the Wichita Eagle who says "Besides a favorable bias, "But in his praise for the former president, Parmet tends to diminish the influence of other plays such as Dwight David Eisenhower and John F Kennedy... Richard Nixon and His America" suffers from an imbalance in events and issues." In the article, Johnson was critical of biases on Parmet's half regarding his high thoughts of Nixon. Mel Small of the Detroit Free Press makes claims that parrot the praise and criticism of Nixon's work, discouraged by his narrow inclusion of the Watergate scandal, but also agrees that "Along the way, [Parmet] makes a reasonable case for the consideration of Nixon as a reasonable politician"

In a review to his writings on former president Dwight Eisenhower, Robert Kirsch of the Los Angeles Times commended the book by Parmet, appending "This is not only a narrative of the administration, and a portrait of the man, it is told against the background of America, and the world, and told brilliantly." Historian Steve Neal called it a "fascinating and scholarly account." Richard Walton said that the work was "comprehensive and fair" and that "Parmet was tough, and justifiably so" in his criticisms of Ike. Frederick Marquardt of the Arizona Republic disparaged the writing in certain aspects, arguing that the book was a "long rambling account" of his presidency and that the book could have benefitted from "more selectivity" and disregarding many details that the average reader may not want to know. Marquardt's opinion was not unpopular among reviewers, with fellow journalist Thomas Lask of the New York Times describing the biographical work as "a clumsy, ill-proportioned book in which the material gets in the way of the subject".

Regarding his book on the post-FDR Democratic Party, Scott Shrewsbury of the Star Tribune describes his account and analysis as "a narrative plagued by a rash of factual errors and stylistic deficiencies" also arguing that he "[ignored] the true dimensions of the country's needs...", mostly in response to an argument made by Parmet suggesting that the Democratic Party was attempting to accommodate a variety of beliefs "until the seams strain", proposing a solution against his self-described "umbrella" of the party.
