= Arthur Walworth =

American writer and biographer

Arthur Clarence Walworth (July 9, 1903 — January 10, 2005) was an American writer and biographer. Of his works from the 1930s to 1980s, Walworth wrote two books on Woodrow Wilson. As part of a 1958 two volume biography on Wilson, Walworth received the Pulitzer Prize for Biography or Autobiography in 1959 with Woodrow Wilson: American Prophet. His other book on Wilson was Wilson and his Peacemakers in 1986. Other topics Walworth wrote on were about Matthew C. Perry and a timeline between World War I and the Paris Peace Conference. Apart from writing, Walworth edited and sold academic works for Houghton Mifflin Company between the late 1920s to early 1940s. He also worked with the United States Office of War Information in 1943.

== Early life and education ==
On July 9, 1903, Walworth was born in Newton, Massachusetts. Growing up, Walworth played baseball while completing his education in Newton, Massachusetts. For his post-secondary studies, Walworth received a Bachelor of Arts from Yale University in the mid 1920s. While completing his English program, Walworth worked for the Yale Daily News as a newspaper editor.

== Career ==
From 1925 to 1926, Walworth was a teacher at the Yali High School in Changsha, Hunan Province, under the auspices of the Yale-China English Teaching Fellowship Scheme. During the late 1920s to early 1940s, Walworth worked for Houghton Mifflin Company. With Houghton Mifflin, he edited and sold academic works. Walworth also briefly worked for the United States Office of War Information in 1943.

== Works ==
In 1935, Walworth contributed several chapters to an updated version of William Elliot Griffis's book China's Story: In Myth, Legend and Annals. Walworth released School Histories at War in 1938, which compared high school history textbooks used in various countries. In 1946, Walworth released Black Ships Off Japan, a book about Matthew C. Perry's exploration of Japan. Subsequent books by Walworth were Cape Brenton, Isle of Romance in 1948 and The Medomak Way in 1953.

As a biographer, Walworth completed a biography on Woodrow Wilson in 1958 after a decade of writing. With Woodrow Wilson, the first volume was titled American Prophet while the second volume was named World Prophet. For the first volume of his Woodrow Wilson biography, Walworth was awarded the Pulitzer Prize for Biography or Autobiography in 1959. For fifteen years after his Woodrow work, Walworth studied the events in between the end of World War I and the leadup to the Paris Peace Conference. His studies led to the publication of Wilson and his Peacemakers in 1986. His second book on Wilson took twenty five years to complete and came twenty eight years after the release of his Wilson biography.

== Personal life and death ==
In 1986, Walworth retired and lived in Needham, Massachusetts. While in Needham, Walworth died on January 10, 2005. He was unmarried and had no children.
