= Ku Klux Klan members in United States politics =

This is a partial list of notable historical figures in U.S. national politics who were members of the Ku Klux Klan (KKK) before taking office. Membership of the Klan is secret. Political opponents sometimes allege that a person was a member of the Klan, or was supported at the polls by Klan members.

== Politicians who were active in the Ku Klux Klan ==
In 2018, The Washington Post reported that, by 1930, the KKK, while its "membership remained semi-secret, claimed 11 governors, 16 senators and as many as 75 congressmen – roughly split between Republicans and Democrats." The actual names were never released.

== Supreme Court justices ==
=== Hugo Black ===
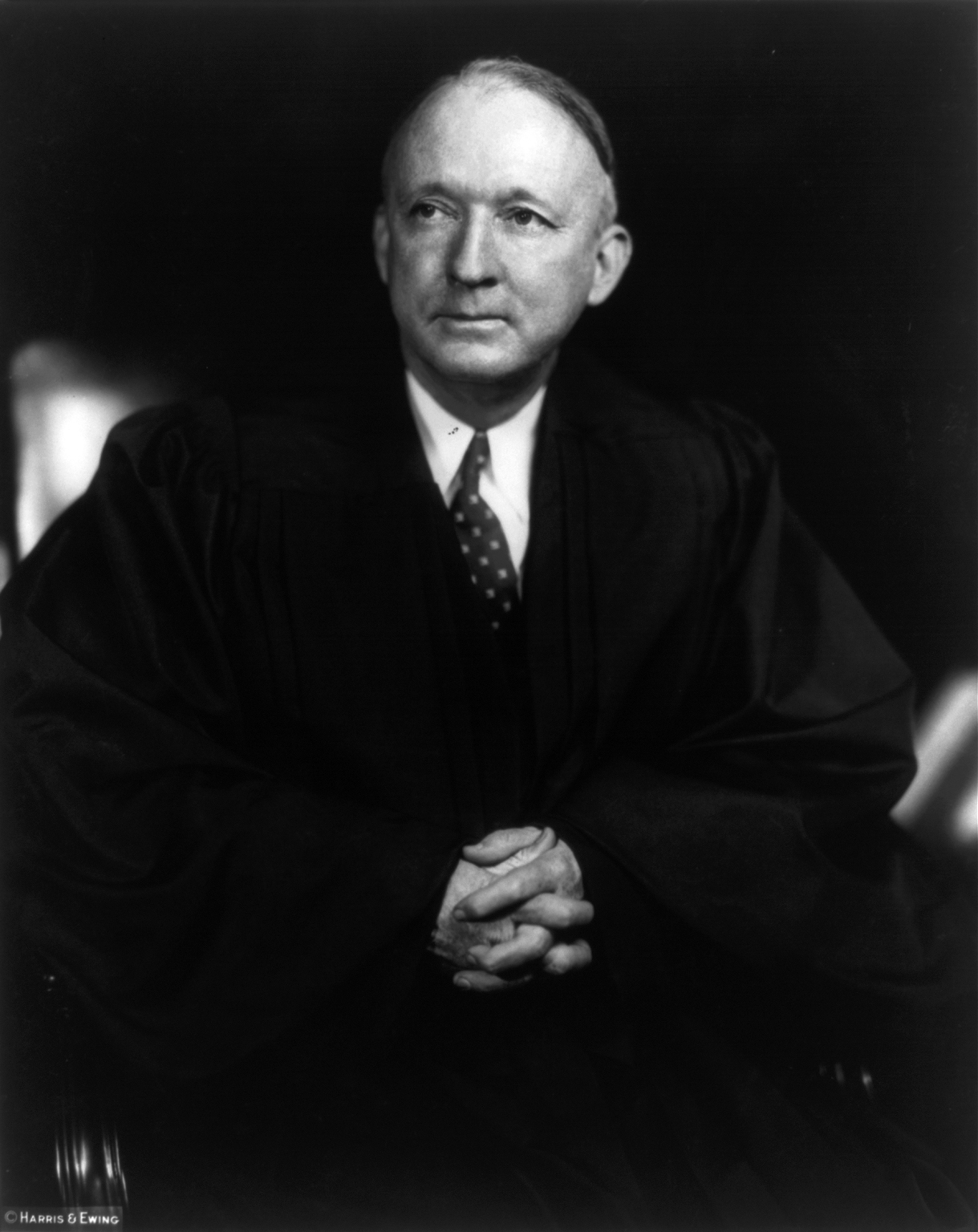
Supreme Court Justice Hugo Black

In 1921, Hugo Black (D) successfully defended E. R. Stephenson in his trial for the murder of a Catholic priest, Fr. James E. Coyle. Stephenson's daughter had converted to Catholicism and married a man of Puerto Rican descent, and Coyle had conducted the wedding. Black got Stephenson acquitted in part by arguing to the jury that Puerto Ricans should be considered black under the South's one drop rule. Black joined the Ku Klux Klan shortly afterwards, in order to gain votes from the anti-Catholic element in Alabama. He built his winning Senate campaign in 1926 around multiple appearances at KKK meetings across Alabama. Late in life, Black told an interviewer:

"At that time, I was joining every organization in sight! ... In my part of Alabama, the Klan was engaged in unlawful activities ... The general feeling in the community was that if responsible citizens didn't join the Klan it would soon become dominated by the less responsible members."

News of his membership was a secret until shortly before he was confirmed as an associate justice of the United States Supreme Court in 1937. Black later said that joining the Klan was a mistake, but he went on to say, "I would have joined any group if it helped get me votes." (Note: Hugo Black's membership was the subject of Ray Sprigle's 1938 series of articles in the Pittsburgh Post-Gazette, for which Sprigle won a Pulitzer Prize.)

On the Supreme Court, Black wrote the opinion in Korematsu v. United States, which upheld the exclusion of Japanese Americans from the West Coast. Black also wrote the opinion in Everson v. Board of Education, a key case about the separation of church and state. Some have argued that his views on the separation of church and state were influenced by the Klan's anti-Catholicism.

Despite his former Klan membership, Black joined the Supreme Court's unanimous decisions in Shelley v. Kraemer (1948), which outlawed judicial enforcement of racially restrictive covenants, and Brown v Board of Education, which outlawed school segregation. Justice William O. Douglas would write years later that at least three (and possibly as many as five) justices were originally planning to rule school segregation constitutional, but Black had actually been one of the four justices planning to strike down school segregation from the beginning of the Brown case.

== Members of the Senate ==
=== Theodore G. Bilbo ===
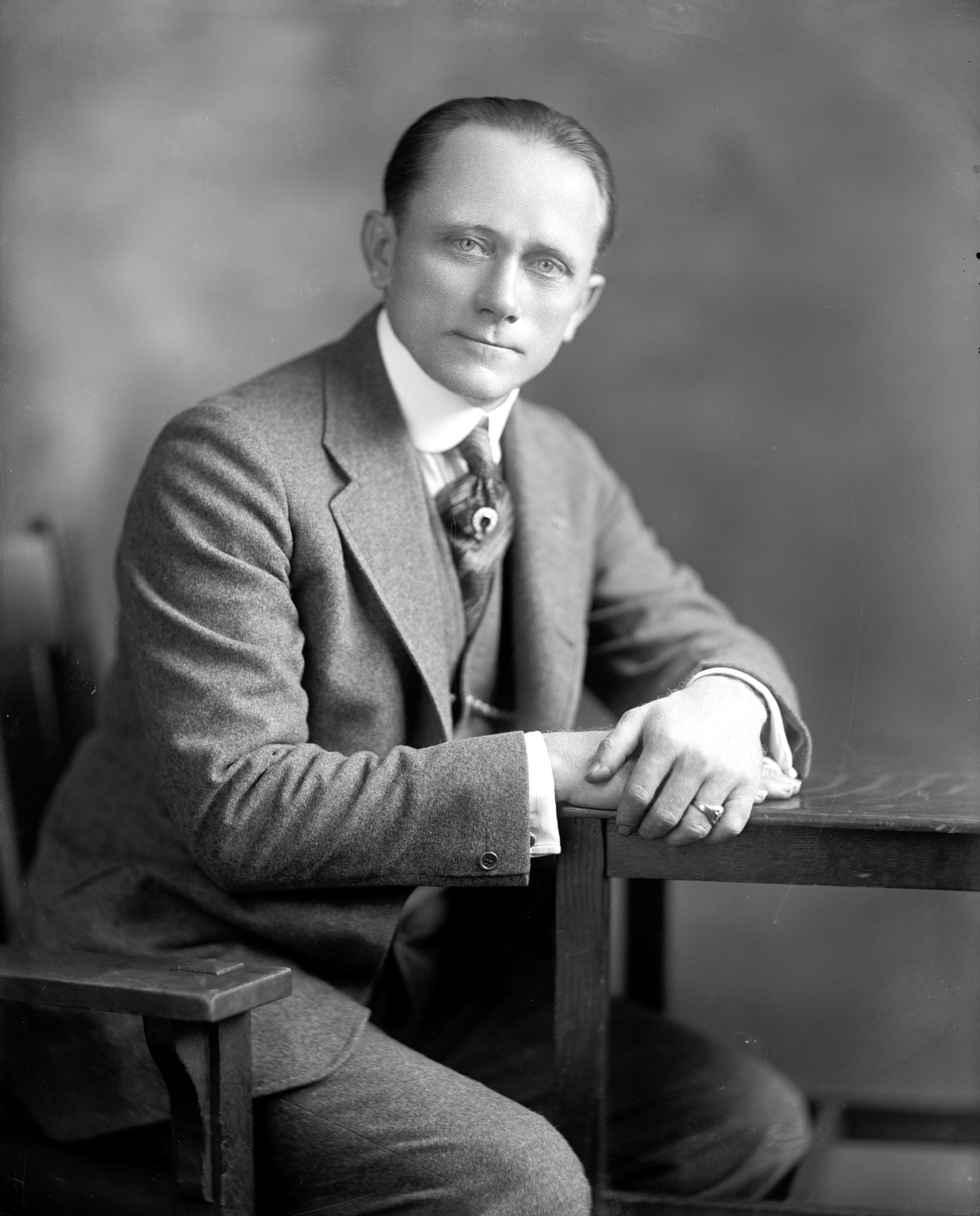
Theodore G. Bilbo, U.S. Senator for Mississippi

Theodore G. Bilbo (D), the U.S. Senator for Mississippi (1935–1947), stated he was a member of the KKK.

=== Joseph E. Brown ===
Joseph E. Brown (D), the U.S. Senator for Georgia (1880–1891), was a key supporter of the KKK in his home state.

=== Robert C. Byrd ===
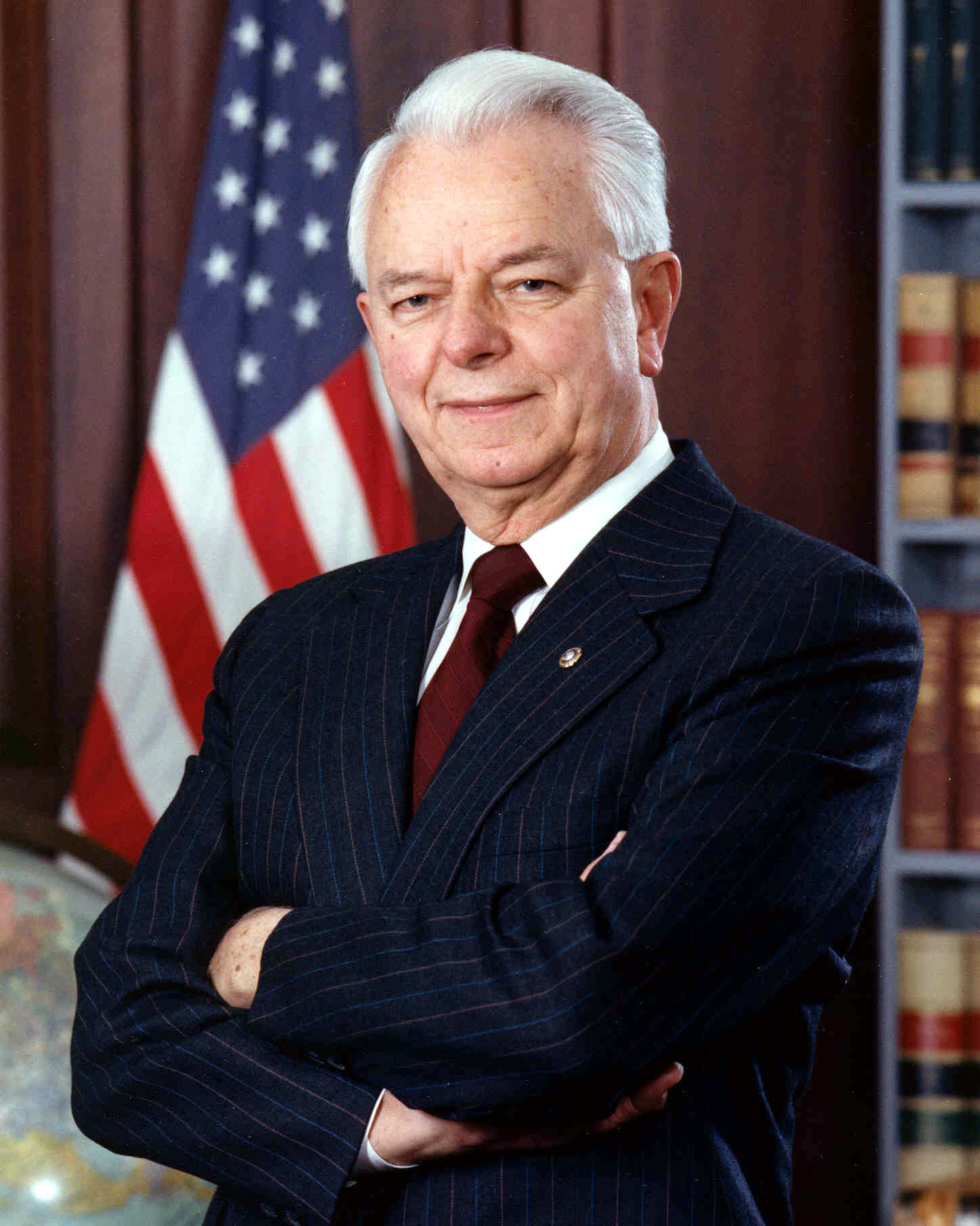
Robert Byrd, U.S. Senator for West Virginia

Robert Byrd (1917–2010) was a Kleagle, a Klan recruiter, in his 20s and 30s, rising to the title of Kleagle and Exalted Cyclops of his local chapter. After leaving the group, Byrd spoke in favor of the Klan during his early political career. Though he later said he officially left the organization in 1943, Byrd wrote a letter in 1946 to the group's Imperial Wizard stating "The Klan is needed today as never before, and I am anxious to see its rebirth here in West Virginia." Byrd attempted to explain or defend his former membership in the Klan in his 1958 U.S. Senate campaign when he was 41 years old. Byrd, a Democrat, eventually became his party leader in the Senate, and by the 2000s was considered one of the chambers most liberal members. Byrd later said joining the Klan was his "greatest mistake," and after his death, the NAACP released a statement praising Byrd, acknowledging his former affiliation with the Klan and saying that he "became a champion for civil rights and liberties" and "came to consistently support the NAACP civil rights agenda". In a 2001 interview, Byrd used the term "white niggers" twice during a national television broadcast. The full quote ran as follows: "My old mom told me, 'Robert, you can't go to heaven if you hate anybody.' We practice that. There are white niggers. I've seen a lot of white niggers in my time. I'm going to use that word. We just need to work together to make our country a better country, and I'd just as soon quit talking about it so much." Byrd later apologized for the phrase and admitted that it "has no place in today's society," and did not clarify the intended meaning of the term in his context.

=== John Brown Gordon ===
John Brown Gordon (D), the U.S. Senator for Georgia (1873–1880 and 1891–1897), had been a founder of the KKK in his home state of Georgia in the 1860s.

=== James Thomas Heflin ===
James Thomas Heflin (1869–1951) (D), the U.S. Senator for Alabama, was suspected of being a member of the KKK in 1920s.

=== Rufus C. Holman ===
Rufus C. Holman (R), the Senator for Oregon (1939–1945), was an active member of the Ku Klux Klan (KKK) in Oregon in the 1920s.

=== Rice W. Means ===
Rice W. Means (R), the Senator for Colorado (1924–1927), was the directing head of the Ku Klux Klan in Colorado in 1920s.

=== John Tyler Morgan ===
John Tyler Morgan (D) (1824–1907, the U.S. Senator for Alabama (March 4, 1877, to June 11, 1907), was the Grand Dragon of the KKK in Alabama in 1860s.

=== Edmund Pettus ===
Edmund Pettus (1821–1907) (D), the U.S. Senator for Alabama (1896 to 1907), was also a Grand Dragon of the KKK in Alabama in 1860s.

=== William Bliss Pine ===
William Bliss Pine (1877–1942) (R), the U.S. Senator for Oklahoma (1925, to 1931), was a Klansman in 1920s, according to historian Chalmers and the Eufaula Indian Journal.

== Non-Klan Senators who received support from the Klan ==
=== Lawrence C. Phipps ===
The Klan helped elect Lawrence C. Phipps (1862–1958) (R), U.S. Senator for Colorado.

=== Owen Brewster ===
Republican Owen Brewster (1888–1961) received crucial support from the Klan in his election as Governor of Maine (1925–1929), and went on to become a U.S. Congressman, and then U.S. Senator (1941–1952). Former Maine Republican governor Percival Baxter accused Brewster of having been actually inducted into the Klan.

=== Daniel F. Steck ===
Daniel F. Steck (1881–1950) (D), of Iowa, in 1925, with the help of the Klan, defeated Senator Smith W. Brookhart (1869–1944) (R), a progressive. Because the vote was close, there was a recount, and Steck was the victor. Brookhart contested it. Steck reportedly had no Klan connections, except that he enlisted the Klan's top lawyer and legislative expert, William Francis Zumbrunn (1877–1930), to secure his seat in the 69th Congress (1925–1926). Earlier, Zumbrunn – with lawyer William Pinkney McLean Jr. (1872–1937) of Fort Worth – helped seat Klan Senator from Texas, Earle Mayfield.

=== Frederick Steiwer ===
In the 1926 Oregon election, the Ku Klux Klan, under the auspices of The Oregon Good Government League, helped Frederick Steiwer (1883–1939) win the Republican primary by spreading word that it was supporting the reelection of his opponent, Senator Robert N. Stanfield (1877–1945) (R). The effort was fueled by white supremacist (anti-immigrant, anti-Catholic) groups in Oregon in support of the state's Compulsory Education Act, enacted in 1922, mandating public education; which would have taken effect in 1926; but the Supreme Court, in 1925, struck it down in Pierce v. Society of Sisters.

=== Arthur Raymond Robinson ===
Arthur Raymond Robinson (1881–1961) (R), of Indiana, was, on November 2, 1925, characterized by Time magazine was follows: "The New Man. Arthur R. Robinson is only 44. He is an Indianapolis attorney, a 'good Republican' but of no particular political importance. He is said to be a good orator. Against him politically is the fact that he supported Governor Jackson in the last election and so, justly or unjustly, he is considered a 'Klan man.'"

=== Frank Willis ===
In 1926 the Klan supported Republican Frank B. Willis in Ohio not because it liked him, but because it disliked his anti-Klan opponent, Democrat Atlee Pomerene, more.

== Members of the House of Representatives ==
=== Clifford Davis ===
Clifford Davis (D), U.S. Representative for Tennessee (1940 to 1965) had been an active member in Tennessee in the 1920s.

=== George Washington Gordon ===
George Washington Gordon (D), U.S. Representative for Tennessee's 10th congressional district, became one of the Klan's first members. In 1867, Gordon became the Klan's first Grand Dragon for the Realm of Tennessee, and wrote its Precscript, a constitution setting out the organization's purpose, principles, and the like.

=== George S. Long ===
George S. Long (D), U.S. Representative for Louisiana's 8th congressional district, was an active member in Oklahoma in the 1920s.

=== William D. Upshaw ===
William D. Upshaw (D), U.S. Representative for Georgia's 5th congressional district, was an active member in Georgia in 1920s.

=== John Stephens Wood ===
John Stephens Wood (D), U.S. Representative for Georgia's 9th congressional district, was a former member in Georgia, albeit he only attended one meeting. However, Wood has also been implicated as a participant in the lynching of Leo Frank.

== Governors ==
=== Homer Martin Adkins ===
Homer Martin Adkins (D), (1890–1964) the Governor of Arkansas, was a supporter of the Klan in his home state of Arkansas.

=== Bibb Graves ===
Bibb Graves (D), (1873–1942) was the Governor of Alabama. He lost his first campaign for governor in 1922, but four years later, with the secret endorsement of the Ku Klux Klan, he was elected to his first term as governor. Graves was almost certainly the Exalted Cyclops (chapter president) of the Montgomery chapter of the Klan. Graves, like Hugo Black, used the strength of the Klan to further his electoral prospects.

=== Edward L. Jackson ===
Edward L. Jackson (R), (1873–1954) was the Governor of Indiana in 1925 and his administration came under fire for granting undue favor to the Klan's agenda and associates. Jackson was further damaged by the arrest and trial of Grand Dragon D. C. Stephenson for the rape and murder of Madge Oberholtzer. When it was revealed that Jackson had attempted to bribe former Gov. Warren T. McCray with $10,000 to appoint a Klansman to a local office, Jackson was taken to court. His case ended with a hung jury, and Jackson ended his political career in disgrace. Jackson denied membership and there is no evidence that Jackson ever joined the KKK himself.

=== Henry S. Johnston ===
Henry S. Johnston (D) (1867–1965) was the Governor of Oklahoma from 1927 until his impeachment in 1929. He was a member of the Klan and had the organization's endorsement in the 1926 Oklahoma gubernatorial election.

=== Clarence Morley ===
Clarence Morley (R), (1869–1948) the Governor of Colorado, was a KKK member and a strong supporter of Prohibition. He tried to ban the Catholic Church from using sacramental wine and attempted to have the University of Colorado fire all Jewish and Catholic professors.

=== Tom Terral ===
Tom Terral (D), (1882–1946) the Governor of Arkansas, was an "honorary" member of the KKK in Louisiana.

=== Clifford Walker ===
Clifford Walker (D), (1877–1954) the governor of Georgia, was revealed to be a Klan member by the press in 1924.

== Federal judges ==
=== Elmer David Davies ===
Elmer David Davies (D), a federal judge of the United States District Court for the Middle District of Tennessee, was briefly a member of the KKK while in law school in 1922.

== Statewide officials ==
=== Lee Cazort ===
Lee Cazort (D), the Lieutenant Governor of Arkansas, was active in the Klan in 1920s, and openly endorsed the Klan's platform.

=== John W. Morton ===
John Morton (D), the Tennessee Secretary of State, was the founder of the Nashville chapter of the KKK in the 1860s.

=== Campbell Russell ===
Campbell Russell (D), the Oklahoma Corporation Commissioner from 1917 to 1923, was a member in the 1920s.

=== William L. Saunders ===
William L. Saunders (D), the North Carolina Secretary of State, was the founder of the North Carolina chapter in the 1860s.

=== George F. Short ===
George F. Short (D), the Attorney General of Oklahoma from 1923 to 1927, was a member of the in the 1920s.

== State legislators ==
=== Frank M. Boyer ===
Frank M. Boyer, a state representative from Oklahoma, was a member in the 1920s.

=== David Duke ===
David Duke (D/R), a politician who ran in both Democratic and Republican presidential primaries, was openly involved in the leadership of the Ku Klux Klan. He was founder and Grand Wizard of the Knights of the Ku Klux Klan in the mid-1970s; he re-titled his position as "National Director" and said that the KKK needed to "get out of the cow pasture and into hotel meeting rooms". He left the organization in 1980. He ran for president in the 1988 Democratic presidential primaries. In 1989 Duke switched political parties from Democrat to Republican. In 1989, he became a member of the Louisiana House of Representatives from the 81st district, and was Republican Party chairman for St. Tammany Parish.

=== Washington Elias Hudson ===
Washington E. Hudson, a state senator and representative from Oklahoma, was a founding member of the 1920s Oklahoma Klan in Tulsa.

=== Kaspar K. Kubli ===
Kap Kubli (R), Speaker of the Oregon House of Representatives from 1923 to 1924.

=== Allen Street ===
Allen Street, an Oklahoma state representative, Oklahoma City Mayor, and Speaker of the Oklahoma House of Representatives was a member in the 1920s.

=== William Silas Vernon ===
William Silas Vernon, a state representative from Oklahoma, was a member in the 1920s.

== Local officials ==
A notable number of local officials were also Klansmen, resulting in such as the "reign of terror" inflicted on Louisiana in the 1920s by crony "exalted cyclops": Bastrop mayor, John Killian Skipwith, known as Captain J. K. Skipwith, and Mer Rouge mayor, Bunnie McEwin McKoin, MD, better known as Dr. B. M. McKoin (and whose surname was variously misreported as McCoin, M'Koin and McKoln in media).

=== Herman Frederick Newblock ===
Herman Frederick Newblock (D) was mayor of Tulsa and a member of the Klan in the 1920s.

=== John Clinton Porter ===
John Clinton Porter (D) was mayor of Los Angeles and an early supporter of the Klan in the 1920s.

=== Benjamin F. Stapleton ===
Benjamin F. Stapleton (D) was mayor of Denver in the 1920s–1940s. He was a Klan member in the early 1920s and appointed fellow Klansmen to positions in municipal government. Ultimately, Stapleton broke from the Klan and removed several Klansmen from office.

== Allegations of Klan membership ==
=== Warren G. Harding ===
The consensus of modern historians is that Warren G. Harding was never a member, and instead was an important enemy of the Klan. While one source claims Harding, a Republican, was a Ku Klux Klan member while President, that claim is based on a third-hand account of a second-hand recollection in 1985 of a deathbed statement made sometime in the late 1940s concerning an incident in the early 1920s. Independent investigations have turned up many contradictions and no supporting evidence for the claim. Historians reject the claim and note that Harding in fact publicly fought and spoke against the Klan.

The rejected claim was made by Wyn Craig Wade. He stated Harding's membership as fact and gives a detailed account of a secret swearing-in ceremony in the White House, based on a private communication he received in 1985 from journalist Stetson Kennedy. Kennedy, in turn had, along with Elizabeth Gardner, tape recorded some time in the "late 1940s" a deathbed confession of former Imperial Klokard Alton Young. Young claimed to have been a member of the "Presidential Induction Team". Young also said on his deathbed that he had repudiated racism. In his book, The Strange Deaths of President Harding, historian Robert Ferrell says he was unable to find any records of any such "ceremony" in which Harding was brought into the Klan in the White House. John Dean, in his 2004 book Warren G. Harding, also could find no proof of Klan membership or activity on the part of Harding. Review of the personal records of Harding's Personal White House Secretary, George Christian Jr., also do not support the contention that Harding received members of the Klan while in office. Appointment books maintained in the White House, detailing President Harding's daily schedules, do not show any such event.

In their 2005 book Freakonomics, University of Chicago economist Steven D. Levitt and journalist Stephen J. Dubner alluded to Warren Harding's possible Klan affiliation. However, in a New York Times Magazine Freakonomics column, entitled "Hoodwinked? Does it matter if an activist who exposes the inner workings of the Ku Klux Klan isn't open about how he got those secrets?", Dubner and Levitt said that they no longer accepted Stetson Kennedy's testimony about Harding and the Klan.

The 1920 Republican Party platform, which essentially expressed Harding's political philosophy, called for Congress to pass laws combating lynching. Harding denounced lynching in a landmark 21 October 1921 speech in Birmingham, Alabama, which was covered in the national press. Harding also vigorously supported an anti-lynching bill in Congress during his term in the White House. His "comments about race and equality were remarkable for 1921."

Payne argues that the Klan was so angry with Harding's attacks on the KKK that it originated and spread the false rumor that he was a member.

Carl S. Anthony, biographer of Harding's wife, found no such proof of Harding's membership in the Klan. He does however discuss the events leading up to the period when the alleged Klan ceremony was held in June 1923:

[K]nowing that some branches of the Shriners were anti-Catholic and in that sense sympathetic to the Ku Klax Klan and that the Klan itself was holding a demonstration less than a half mile from Washington, Harding censured hate groups in his Shriners speech. The press "considered [it] a direct attack" on the Klan, particularly in light of his criticism weeks earlier of "factions of hatred and prejudice and violence [that] challeng[ed] both civil and religious liberty".

In 2005, The Straight Dope presented a summary of many of these arguments against Harding's membership, and noted that, while it might have been politically expedient for him to join the KKK in public, to do it in private would have been of no benefit to him.

It was falsely rumored, in his lifetime, that Harding was partly of African-American descent, so he would have been an unlikely recruit for the Ku Klux Klan.

=== Calvin Coolidge ===
One common misconception is that President Calvin Coolidge (R) was a Klan member, (Note: Examples of unsourced (or poorly sourced) media averring that Coolidge was a member of the Klan.: 1. "Letters to the Editor". Naples Daily News. June 18, 2007. Archived from the original on December 5, 2020.; 2. "Presidents and Others Who Were Members of the KKK". able2know.org. Archived from the original on November 11, 2020.; 3. "Revealed: 5 US Presidents Members of Racist Cult Ku Klux Klan (photos)". The Trent, Nigeria's Internet Newspaper. Lagos, Nigeria: A publication of Ziza Media, A Division of Ziza Group. July 19, 2014. Archived from the original on November 11, 2020. (This article originally appeared July 18, 2014, on I Love Black People, then re-posted March 24, 2016, on the same site). → Same article, but archived from the July 18, 2014, post → "Five US Presidents Were Members of the Ku Klux Klan". iloveblackpeople.net. July 2014. Archived from the original on July 21, 2014 – via Wayback Machine.) a claim that Klan websites have spread. In reality, Coolidge was adamantly opposed to the Klan. According to Jerry L. Wallace at the Coolidge Foundation, "Coolidge expressed his antipathy to the Klan by reaching out in a positive, public way directly to its victims: Blacks, Jews, Catholics, and immigrants, with whom he had good relations—especially so for Irish Catholics—going back long before the rise of the Invisible Empire ... [and] sought to highlight their positive achievements and contributions to American life." Ironically, many Klan members voted for the Republican Coolidge in the 1924 presidential election because the Democratic presidential nominee John W. Davis denounced the Klan at the party's convention.

=== Harry S. Truman ===
Harry S. Truman, the Democratic politician who became president in 1945, was accused by opponents of having dabbled with the Klan briefly. In 1922, he was running for eastern judge, this being the position for one of three court judges in Jackson County, Missouri. His friends Edgar Hinde and Spencer Salisbury advised him to join the Klan. The Klan was politically powerful in Jackson County, and two of Truman's opponents in the Democratic primary had Klan support. Truman refused at first, but paid the Klan's $10 membership fee, and a meeting with a Klan officer was arranged.

According to Salisbury's version of the story, Truman was inducted, but afterward "was never active; he was just a member who wouldn't do anything". Salisbury, however, told the story after he became Truman's bitter enemy, so historians are reluctant to believe his claims. (Note: Salisbury was a war buddy and former business partner of Truman's. Salisbury believed that Truman attempted "to give Jim Pendergast control of [their] business." Truman alerted federal officials about Salisbury, leading to Salisbury's conviction for filing a false affidavit. Salisbury contradicts Hinde's statement that the meeting at the Hotel Baltimore was one-on-one, naming at least six individuals who were present. Salisbury states that at the meeting, Truman had to receive a special dispensation to join, because his grandfather Solomon had been a Jew; however, Solomon was not a Jew, and the rumor of Truman's Jewish ancestry was only spread later, by the Klan, once the political lines had been drawn so that Truman was the Klan's enemy. (Steinberg, 1962))

According to Hinde and Margaret Truman's accounts, the Klan officer demanded that Truman pledge not to hire any Catholics or Jews if he was reelected. Truman refused, and demanded the return of his $10 membership fee; most of the men he had commanded in World War I had been local Irish Catholics. (Note: The author, Wade, gives essentially this version of the events, but implies that the meeting was a regular Klan meeting, rather than an individual meeting between Truman and a Klan organizer. An interview with Hinde at the Truman Library's website ("Oral History Interview with Edgar G. Hinde" by James R. Fuchs, 15 March 1962 Archived August 24, 2017, at the Wayback Machine, retrieved June 26, 2005) portrays it as a one-on-one meeting at the Hotel Baltimore with a Klan organizer named Jones. Truman's biography, written by his daughter (Truman, 1973), agrees with Hinde's version, but does not mention the $10 initiation fee; the same biography reproduces a telegram from O.L. Chrisman stating that reporters from the Hearst papers had questioned him about Truman's past with the Klan, and that he had seen Truman at a Klan meeting, but that "if he ever became a member of the Klan I did not know it." (Wade, 1987, p. 196))

Truman had at least one other strong reason to object to the anti-Catholic requirement, which was that the Catholic Pendergast family, which operated a political machine in Jackson County, were his patrons; Pendergast family lore has it that Truman was originally accepted for patronage without even meeting him, on the basis of his family background plus the fact that he was not a member of any anti-Catholic organization such as the Klan. The Pendergast faction of the Democratic Party was known as the "Goats", as opposed to the rival Shannon machine's "Rabbits". The battle lines were drawn when Truman put only Goats on the county payroll, and the Klan began encouraging voters to support Protestant, "100% American" candidates, allying itself against Truman and with the Rabbits, while Shannon instructed his people to vote Republican in the election, which Truman lost.

Truman later claimed that the Klan "threatened to kill me, and I went out to one of their meetings and dared them to try", speculating that if Truman's armed friends had shown up earlier, violence might have resulted. However, biographer Alonzo Hamby believes that this story, which is not supported by any recorded facts, was a confabulation based on a meeting with a hostile and menacing group of Democrats that contained many Klansmen, showing Truman's "Walter Mitty-like tendency ... to rewrite his personal history". Sympathetic observers see Truman's flirtation with the Klan as a momentary aberration, point out that his close friend and business partner Eddie Jacobson was Jewish, and say that in later years Truman's presidency marked the first significant improvement in the federal government's record on civil rights since the post-Reconstruction nadir marked by the Wilson administration. (Note: McCullough notes this extensively in his biography of Truman. While Truman had been raised in a family with Southern and Confederate leanings, he [Truman] still maintained his belief "in the brotherhood of all men before the law." (McCullough, p. 247) As President, Truman was a leader in promoting civil rights for Blacks.)

=== Ralph Northam ===
Ralph Northam (D), governor of Virginia from 2018 to 2022, was accused of ties to the Ku Klux Klan. In a photo included in his 1984 college yearbook, Northam's page shows an image with two people in costumes: one wearing blackface, and the other wearing a cloak and mask similar to traditional KKK garb. As both people's faces were obscured, it was not clear which person was Northam.

Northam served as governor for over a year until this photograph was widely publicized on the Big League Politics news website. The incident initiated the 2019 Virginia Political Crisis. Northam apologized for "the decision I made to appear as I did in this photo", but he refused calls to resign and served the rest of his term.

== See also ==
- 1924 Democratic National Convention#"Klanbake" meme, a false claim
- History of the Ku Klux Klan in New Jersey
- Indiana Klan
- Ku Klux Klan in Inglewood, California
- Ku Klux Klan in Maine
- Ku Klux Klan in Oregon
- Tom Metzger

== Bibliography ==
=== News media ===
- CNN (March 4, 2001). "Top Senate Democrat Apologizes for Slur". CNN, Inside Politics. Archived from the original on October 9, 2003.
- Colorado Independent (The); Cara Degette (January 9, 2009). "When Colorado Was Klan Country". Denver. Archived from the original on September 9, 2018.
- Littwin, Mike (January 9, 2009). "The Gov's Race: There's Extreme, and Then There's Extreme". Denver: The Colorado Independent. Archived from the original on September 9, 2018.
- Daily Sentinel (The) (September 16, 1926). "Defeat Becomes Overwhelming As Belated Returns Come In; Anti-Klan Majorities Mount". The Daily Sentinel (AP). Vol. 33, no. 296. Grand Junction, Colorado. p. 8. Archived from the original on June 7, 2020 – via Newspapers.com. LCCN sn86-66870; OCLC 11217358 (all editions).
- Denver Post; Bartels, Lynn (March 4, 2014). "Bob Beauprez Bypasses KKK Member, Attacks Hickenlooper as Most 'Extreme' Governor". Denver Post. Archived from the original on March 6, 2014. The Spot Archived May 22, 2021, at the Wayback Machine → political blog of the Denver Post.
- Fayetteville Daily Democrat (August 9, 1922). "M'Crae Leads Two to One; Cubage and Herbert Wilson Races Close; Toney Has Carried Seven Counties" (Parke-Harper News Service of Little Rock → founded in 1911 by Augustus Winfield Parke; 1878–1961 & Clio Armitage Harper; 1872–1932). Vol. 28, no. 223. Fayetteville, Arkansas: Fayetteville Democrat Company. p. 1. Archived from the original on May 20, 2021 – via NewspaperArchive. LCCN sn88051010, OCLC 18126013 (all editions).
- "Senator Robert Byrd Says White Niggers". rcmtrox. Event occurs at 1 minute, 13 seconds. Archived from the original on June 25, 2020 – via YouTube. (taped March 2, 2001; posted to YouTube January 17, 2009).
- Indian Journal (October 9, 1924). "Walton Addresses 2000 Voters". Vol. 48, no. 46. Eufaula, Oklahoma: Indian Journal, The (weekly). p. 1. Archived from the original on May 24, 2021 – via Newspapers.com. (Alexander Posey; 1873–1908; was founder of the Indian Journal) LCCN sn96087901; OCLC 34998711 (all editions).
- Kingsport Times (The) (July 13, 1939). "Davies Opposition Grows in Senate – Confirmation of Tennessean for U.S. Judge Recalled by Committee". Vol. 24, no. 168 (Home ed.). Kingsport, Tennessee. pp. 1 & 16. Archived from the original on May 19, 2021 – via Newspapers.com. (Davies joined the KKK while in Louisiana and attended a meeting while at Vanderbilt University). |author1-link=The Kingsport Times
- NAACP (June 29, 2010). "NAACP Mourns the Passing of U.S. Senator Robert Byrd". NAACP Press Room. Archived from the original on July 7, 2010.
- Nashville Tennessean (November 21, 1914). "John W. Morton Passes Away in Shelby" (obituary). Vol. 8, no. 194 (Home ed.). pp. 1–2. Archived from the original on March 8, 2021 – via Newspapers.com. "To Captain Morton came the peculiar distinction of having organized that branch of the Ku Klux Klan which operated in Nashville and the adjacent territory, but a more signal honor was his when he performed the ceremonies which initiated Gen. Nathan Bedford Forrest into the mysterious ranks of the Ku Klux Klan"
- News & Observer (The); Stancill, [Margaret] Jane (March 26, 2014). "Crowd Pushes UNC to Rename Hall". The News & Observer. Vol. 2015, no. 85. Raleigh, North Carolina. pp. 1 & 6 (section A). Archived from the original on May 20, 2021 – via Newspapers.com.
- New York Times (The) (April 19, 1923). "Warrants Out for Klan in Morehouse – Captain Skipwith, Exalted Cyclops, Charged with Conspiring to Murder – Nearly a Score Accused – Jeff Burnett and Dr. Mckoln Among Alleged Men Rouge Hooded Kidnappers Sought". The New York Times. Vol. 73, no. 23826. p. 21 (column 3) – via TimesMachine..
- New York Times (The) (August 11, 1924). "Klan in Southwest Faces Another Test – Hopes to Nominate Its Candidate for Governor in Arkansas Primary Tomorrow". The New York Times. Vol. 73, no. 24306. p. 2 (column 3 of 8) – via TimesMachine..
- New York Times (The) (August 14, 1924). "Klan Loses in Arkansas – Terral Leads Cazort in Race for Nomination for Governor". The New York Times. Vol. 73, no. 24309. p. 2 (column 3 of 8) – via TimesMachine..
- New York Times (The) (November 6, 1924). "Victories by Klan Feature Election – Order Elects Senators in Oklahoma and Colorado, Governors in Kansas, Indiana, Colorado – All on Republican Ticket – Only Setback for Ku Klux Was Triumph of Mrs. Ferguson as Democratic Governor of Texas". The New York Times. Vol. 74, no. 24388. p. 1 (column 7) & p. 3 – via TimesMachine.
- New York Times (The); Hinton, Harold B (August 14, 1946). "Bilbo KKK Avowal Stumps Mississippi – Between 'Why Not?' of Friends and 'He's Clowning' of Foes Is a Fear He Calls Turn". New York Times, The. Vol. 95, no. 32344. p. 14 – via TimesMachine..
- New York Times Magazine; Dubner, Stephen Joseph; Levitt, Steven D. Levitt (January 8, 2006). "The Way We Live Now: 01-08-06: Freakonomics – Hoodwinked?". The New York Times (Sunday supplement of The New York Times) (National ed.). pp. 26–28 (section 6). Archived from the original on July 17, 2016. → Dubner and Levitt, co-authors of Freakonomics – A Rogue Economist Explores the Hidden Side of Everything (2005), review their own book.
- New York Times (The); Clymer, Adam (June 28, 2010) [June 29, 2010]. "Robert C. Byrd, a Pillar of the Senate, Dies at 92". The New York Times. p. 1 (section A). ISSN 0362-4331. Archived from the original on June 30, 2010.
- New York Times (The); Baker, Peter (August 18, 2015). "White House Memo – DNA Shows Warren Harding Wasn't America's First Black President". New York Times, The. ProQuest 1714233466. Archived from the original on October 25, 2019. (U.S. Newsstream database).
- Philadelphia Inquirer (January 10, 1923). "Ku Klux Unmasked at Torture Probe by Defiant Victims". The Philadelphia Inquirer. Vol. 188, no. 10. pp. 1 & 2. Archived from the original on February 1, 2021 – via Newspapers.com.
- Roseburg New-Review (August 16, 1926). "U'Ren Charges Corruption in Steiwer Ranks" (AP). Vol. 27, no. 214. Roseburg, Oregon. p. 1 – via Newspapers.com. OCLC 52498570 (all editions).
- Straight Dope (The); Corrado, John (November 8, 2005). "Was Warren Harding Inducted Into the KKK While President?" (A Staff Report From the Straight Dope Science Advisory Board). Chicago: Creative Loafing Media, Inc. Archived from the original on January 26, 2021.
- Washington Post (The); Pianin, Eric [Stuart] (June 19, 2005). "A Senator's Shame – Byrd, in His New Book, Again Confronts Early Ties to KKK" (review of Byrd's 2005 autobiography: Robert C. Byrd: Child of the Appalachian Coalfields) (Final ed.). p. 1A. Archived from the original on March 8, 2023. "During his [1958] Senate campaign, he [Byrd] told a newspaper reporter that he personally felt the Klan had been incorrectly blamed for many acts committed by others." ProQuest 409811201 (U.S. Newsstream database).
- Washington Post (The); Mendelsohn, Jennifer; Shulman, Peter A. (March 18, 2018). "How Social Media Spread a Historical Lie" (blog). Archived from the original on December 22, 2020. ProQuest 2014080716 (U.S. Newsstream database).
- Washington Post (The); Robenalt, James D. (June 21, 2020). "The Republican President Who Called for Racial Justice in America After Tulsa Massacre – Warren G. Harding's Comments About Race and Equality Were Remarkable For 1921". Archived from the original on June 22, 2020.

––––––––––––––––––––

- Selected archival access to The New York Times → LCCN sn78-4456
- ISSN 0362-4331, OCLC 1645522 (all editions), 858655519, 7764137 (microfilm), 69647843 (microfilm, International ed.)
- TimesMachine (every issue published before December 31, 2002)
- Newspapers.com (1851–1922).

=== Books, journals, magazines, papers, websites ===
- ADL Report (January 3, 2013). "Introduction" and "On the KKK". David Duke: In His Own Words (PDF). New York: Anti-Defamation League. pp. 1–2 & 3 (of 8). Archived (PDF) from the original on May 8, 2018.
  "On the KKK" → Transcript of a letter announcing Duke's resignation from the Klan which accompanied the first issue of NAAWP News (National Association for the Advancement of White People), August 1980.
- Alexander, Charles C[omer] (1935–2011). (9 publications)
  → The Ku Klux Klan in Texas, 1920–1927 (M.A. thesis). University of Texas at Austin. September 1959. OCLC 27257144 (all editions).
  → "The Ku Klux Klan in Texas, 1920–1930". The Historian of the University of Texas. 1 (1). Austin: Beta Alpha chapter of Phi Alpha Theta, University of Texas at Austin: 21–43. September 1962. → publication was renamed Paisano ISSN 0078-7841; OCLC 259708495 (all editions); OCLC 4913350 (all editions) (publication).
  → Crusade for Conformity: The Ku Klux Klan in Texas, 1920–1930. Publication Series. Vol. 6. Houston: Texas Gulf Coast Historical Association. 1962. (the publication ceased in 1985 and is archived at the Houston Metropolitan Research Center)
  → Invisible Empire in the Southwest: The Ku Klux Klan in Texas, Louisiana, Oklahoma, and Arkansas, 1920–1930 (PhD dissertation). University of Texas at Austin. June 1962. OCLC 962864221 (all editions).
  → Alexander, Charles C. (Spring 1963). "White-Robed Reformers: The Ku Klux Klan Comes to Arkansas, 1921–1922". The Arkansas Historical Quarterly. 22 (1). Arkansas Historical Association: 8–23. doi:10.2307/40018939. ISSN 0004-1823. JSTOR 40018939. OCLC 5543625678.
  → Alexander, Charles C. (Autumn 1963). "White Robes in Politics: The Ku Klux Klan in Arkansas, 1922–1924". The Arkansas Historical Quarterly. 22 (3). Arkansas Historical Association: 195–214. doi:10.2307/40007660. ISSN 0004-1823. JSTOR 40007660. OCLC 5543623062.
  → Alexander, Charles C. (Winter 1963). "Defeat, Decline, Disintegration: The Ku Klux Klan in Arkansas, 1924 and After". The Arkansas Historical Quarterly. 22 (4). Arkansas Historical Association: 311–331. doi:10.2307/40018633. ISSN 0004-1823. JSTOR 40018633. OCLC 5543626524.
  → The Ku Klux Klan in the Southwest. Lexington, Kentucky: University of Kentucky Press. May 1965 – via Internet Archive. LCCN 65-11831 ISBN 978-0-8131-6197-6, 0-8131-6197-5; OCLC 1105446036 (all editions), and 490915485.
  → Alexander, Charles C. (Autumn 1965). "Kleagles and Cash: The Ku Klux Klan as a Business Organization, 1915–1930". Business History Review. 39 (3). Arkansas Historical Association: 348–367. doi:10.2307/3112145. ISSN 0007-6805. JSTOR 3112145. OCLC 38467191. S2CID 155831290.
- Alexander, Thomas B. (1949). "Kukluxism in Tennessee, 1865–1869". Tennessee Historical Quarterly. 8 (3): 195–219. ISSN 0040-3261. JSTOR 42621013. OCLC 55483757.
  → Footnote 3. p. 197. "The only list of members known to be extant is in the possession of Stanley F. Horn of Nashville, Tennessee. It is from Marshall County, Middle Tennessee. One preserved prescript from another Tennessee den has penciled upon it the names of Grand Wizard of the Empire (Forrest), the Grand Dragon of the Realm of Tennessee (General George W. Gordon), the Grand Titan of the district (Joe Fussell), and the Grand Giant of the county (E. D. Thompson)" (Horn, 1939, p. 113)
  → "General Nathan Bedford Forrest was made head of the organization with the title of Grand Wizard of the Empire (southern states). Each state was set up as a Realm headed by a Grand Dragon, each congressional district a Dominion under a Grand Titan, and each county a Province under a Grand Giant. The unit was the Den with a Grand Cyclops as its chief officer. A constitution called a Prescript was adopted and printed for circulation ..." (Horn, 1939)
- American Experience (May 5, 2002). "Ulysses S. Grant – Grant, Reconstruction and the KKK" (online article). PBS. Archived from the original on September 27, 2021. From the Collection: The Presidents → The televised portion of the series, "Ulysses S. Grant", was first aired May 5, 2002. OCLC 1057434054 (all editions).
- Anthony, Carl Sferrazza (1998). Florence Harding – The First Lady, The Jazz Age, and the Death of America's Most Scandalous President. William Morrow and Company. ISBN 978-0-688-07794-5 – via Internet Archive. LCCN 97-49955, ISBN 0-6880-7794-3, OCLC 37993669 (all editions).
- Ball, Howard (1996). Hugo L. Black – Cold Steel Warrior. Oxford University Press. pp. 16 & 50. ISBN 978-0-19-507814-5 – via Internet Archive. LCCN 95-14107, ISBN 0-1950-7814-4
- Blackmon, Douglass A. (2008). Slavery by Another Name – The Re-Enslavement of Black Americans From the Civil War to World War II. Doubleday. pp. 107, 371–372 (Brown), 180 (Gordon). ISBN 978-0-385-50625-0 – via Internet Archive. LCCN 2007-34500; ISBN 978-0-3855-0625-0; OCLC 253596175 (all editions).
- Butler, Anne M.; Wolff, Wendy (1995). "Daniel F. Steck v. Smith W. Brookhart". United States Senate Election, Expulsion, and Censure Cases, 1793-1990. Washington, D.C.: U.S. Senate Historical Office; U.S. Government Printing Office. pp. 312–315. Case 105 – via Google Books. (prepared under the direction of Sheila P[atricia] Burke; burn 1951). LCCN 95-35521; OCLC 32970375 (all editions).
- Carter, Joe (December 19, 2013). "How the KKK Got Its Way on Separation of Church and State". Acton Institute Powerblog. Archived from the original on July 19, 2019.
- Chalmers, David Mark (Fall 1965). "The Ku Klux Klan In Politics In The 1920s". Mississippi Quarterly. 18 (4). Johns Hopkins University Press: 234–247. JSTOR 26473702. ISSN 0026-637X (publication); OCLC 7973910754 (article).
- Chalmers, David Mark (1987) [1965, 1968, 1981]. Hooded Americanism – History of the Ku Klux Klan (3rd ed.). Duke University Press. pp. 39, 43–48, 155, 200–201, 202–205, 283. ISBN 978-0-8223-0772-3 – via Internet Archive. LCCN 86-29133, ISBN 0-8223-0730-8, 0-8223-0772-3, OCLC 885415020 (all editions).
- Cheathem, Mark Renfred (June 6, 2014). "Was Calvin Coolidge a Klansman?". Jacksonian America: Society, Personality, and Politics. Archived from the original on November 29, 2020. (jacksonianamerica.com is a website maintained by the author)
- Clark, Carter (1976). "A History of the Ku Klux Klan in Oklahoma" (Ph. D. Thesis). University of Oklahoma.
- Dean, John W. (2004). Schlesinger, Arthur M. Jr. (ed.). Warren G. Harding. The American President Series (1st ed.). Times Books. ISBN 978-0-8050-6956-3 – via Internet Archive. LCCN 2003-49368; ISBN 0-8050-6956-9, 978-0-8050-6956-3; OCLC 815616977 (all editions).
- Drukman, Mason (1997). Wayne Morse: A Political Biography. Portland: Oregon Historical Society Press. pp. 122–123. LCCN 97-3380; ISBN 0-8759-5263-1, 978-0-8759-5263-5; OCLC 654614139 (all editions).
- "Squeezing Lemon – America's Porous Wall Between Church and State – A Supreme Court Case Could Make the Holes Bigger". The Economist. Vol. 430, no. 9132. March 2–8, 2019. Archived from the original on June 13, 2019. "Justice Hugo Black explained in a 5–4 decision why this wall did not stand in the way of a New Jersey law covering the bus fares of Catholic-school students. (This article appeared in the United States section of the print edition under the headline "Cross Roads").
- Feldman, Glenn [Alan] (1999). Politics, Society, and the Klan in Alabama, 1915–1949. Tuscaloosa: University of Alabama Press. p. 88 & 138 – via Internet Archive. LCCN 99-6123; ISBN 0-8173-0983-7, 0-8173-0984-5; OCLC 956973941 (all editions).
- Ferrell, Robert Hugh (1996). The Strange Deaths of President Harding. University of Missouri Press – via Internet Archive. LCCN 96-31838, ISBN 0-8262-1202-6, OCLC 40110954 (all editions).
- Finkelman, Paul (1999). "White, Edward Douglass (3 Nov. 1845 – 19 May 1921)". American National Biography. Vol. 23. Oxford University Press. pp. 195–199 – via Internet Archive. LCCN 98-20826; ISBN 0-1952-0635-5, 0-1951-2802-8 (full set, Vol. 23); OCLC 1003045645 (all editions) (Vol. 23).
- Finkelman, Paul (February 2000). "White, Edward Douglass (3 Nov. 1845 – 19 May 1921)". American National Biography Online. Oxford University Press. doi:10.1093/anb/9780198606697.article.1100912. Archived from the original on November 3, 2010. OCLC 4825703858 (article).
- "Georgia – Governor Clifford Mitchell Walker". www.nga.org. National Governors Association. n.d. Archived from the original on January 28, 2013 – via Wayback Machine.
- Goff, Garland L. Jr. (Spring 2012). Hugo Black's Wall of Separation of Church and State. Senior Honors Theses (undergraduate thesis). Liberty University. OCLC 812676154. Archived from the original on May 8, 2020.
- Goldberg, Robert Alan (1981). Hooded Empire: The Ku Klux Klan in Colorado. Urbana, Illinois: University of Illinois Press. LCCN 81-7625; ISBN 978-0-2520-0848-1; OCLC 492343566 (all editions).
- Gugin, Linda [Ann]; St. Clair, James E[lige], eds. (2006). The Governors of Indiana. Indiana Historical Society Press in cooperation with the Indiana Historical Bureau. pp. 276 & 278. ISBN 978-0-87195-196-0 – via Internet Archive. LCCN 2005-56796; ISBN 978-0-8719-5196-0; OCLC 62697186 (all editions).
- Hamby, Alonzo Lee (1995). A Man of the People – A Life of Harry S. Truman. Oxford University Press. ISBN 978-0-19-504546-8 – via Internet Archive. LCCN 94-43806, ISBN 0-1950-4546-7, OCLC 901371772 (all editions).
- Herbert, Keith Scott (September 14, 2010) [updated April 1, 2019]. "Ku Klux Klan in Alabama During the Reconstruction Era". Encyclopedia of Alabama (online). Alabama Humanities Foundation; Auburn University; University of Alabama Press. Archived from the original on September 22, 2017. OCLC 251464874, 1141449731, 850948989.
- Horn, Stanley Fitzgerald (1939). Invisible Empire – The Story of the Ku Klux Klan, 1866–1871. Cambridge, Massachusetts: Houghton Mifflin Company; The Riverside Press – via Internet Archive. LCCN 39-8103; OCLC 423914 (all editions).
- Jessup, Michael M. (2000). "Consorting with Blood and Violence: The Decline of the Oklahoma Ku Klux Klan" (PDF). Chronicles of Oklahoma. 78 (3): 310.
- Lindgren, Jim (October 20, 2010). "How Separation of Church and State Was Read Into the Constitution (Hint: The KKK Got Its Way)". The Volokh Conspiracy. Archived from the original on May 19, 2021. (reprint from an earlier post → link).
- McAndrew, Tara McClellan (January 25, 2017). "The History of the KKK in American Politics". Politics & History. JSTOR Daily (online). New York: JSTOR. Archived from the original on July 26, 2021. OCLC 892644710 (all editions). → Subtitle: "In the 1920s, during what historians call the KKK's 'second wave,' Klan members served in all levels of American government."
- McCullough, David (1992). Truman. Simon & Schuster. ISBN 978-0-671-45654-2 – via Internet Archive. LCCN 82-5245, ISBN 0-6714-5654-7, OCLC 779284792 (all editions). (see Truman).
- Millhiser, Ian (May 15, 2015). "Brown v. Board of Education Came Very Close To Being A Dark Day In American History". ThinkProgress. Center for American Progress Action Fund. Archived from the original on April 17, 2020.
- Moseley, Clement Charlton (Summer 1973). "The Political Influence of the Ku Klux Klan in Georgia, 1915–1925". Georgia Historical Quarterly. 57 (2). Georgia Historical Society: 235–255. ISSN 0016-8297. JSTOR 40579519. OCLC 5543005771.
- Newman, Roger Kenneth (1994). Hugo Black – A Biography. Pantheon Books. p. 97. ISBN 978-0-679-43180-0 – via Internet Archive. LCCN 94-10233, ISBN 0-6794-3180-2, OCLC 493921265 (all editions).
- Newton, Michael (2014). White Robes and Burning Crosses – A History of the Ku Klux Klan from 1866. Jefferson, North Carolina: McFarland & Company. pp. 60, 63 – via Google Books. (see Truman). LCCN 2013-23632, ISBN 978-0-7864-7774-6, OCLC 896740025 (all editions).
- Noah, Timothy (December 18, 2002). "What About Byrd? Unlike Thurmond, He Renounced His Racist Past". Slate. Archived from the original on October 1, 2007.
- "Thomas Jefferson Terral (1925–1927)". www.arkansasheritage.com. Little Rock: Old State House Museum. Archived from the original on November 14, 2012.
- Payne, Phillip Gene (2009). Dead Last – The Public Memory of Warren G. Harding's Scandalous Legacy (1st ed.). Ohio University Press. pp. 118–120. ISBN 978-0-8214-1818-5 – via Google Books. LCCN 2008-43916; ISBN 978-0-8214-1818-5; OCLC 928896720 (all editions).
- Schoenfeldt, Aaron (2026). "The Klan and Civic Authority in the Aftermath of the 1921 Tulsa Race Massacre". Chronicles of Oklahoma. CIV (2). Oklahoma City, Oklahoma: Oklahoma Historical Society: 149–168.
- Whack, Errin (March 7, 2015). "Who Was Edmund Pettus?" ... "a man bent on preserving slavery and segregation". Smithsonian Magazine (online). Archived from the original on June 27, 2017.
- Sobel, Robert; Raimo, John William, eds. (1978). "Walker, Clifford Mitchell, 1923–1927". Biographical Directory of Governors of the United States 1789–1978. Vol. 1 "(Alabama – Indiana)". Westport, Connecticut: Meckler Books. pp. 315–316 – via Internet Archive. LCCN 77-10435; ISBN 0-9304-6600-4 (full set); ISBN 0-9304-6601-2 (Vol. 1); OCLC 561312187 (all editions).
- Starr, Kevin (1990). Material Dreams – Southern California Through the 1920s. Oxford University Press. pp. 138–139. ISBN 978-0-19-504487-4 – via Internet Archive. LCCN 89-16122; ISBN 0-19-504487-8; OCLC 861983456 (all editions).
- Steinberg, Alfred (1962). Man From Missouri – the Life and Times of Harry S. Truman. G. P. Putnam's Sons & Van Rees Press. LCCN 73-170238, ISBN 0-6880-0005-3, OCLC 1043023982 (all editions).
- Kennedy, William Stetson (March 2000). "Woody Guthrie: Natural Born Anti-Fascist". International Searchlight (magazine) (297). Ilford, England. Archived from the original on November 20, 2004. → Alternate transcript. ISSN 0262-4591 (publication).
- Time (November 2, 1925). "In Indiana". Time. Vol. 6, no. 18 (US ed.).
- Truman, Margaret (1973). Harry S. Truman. William Morrow and Company. ISBN 978-0-688-00005-9 – via Internet Archive. LCCN 73-170238, ISBN 0-6880-0005-3, OCLC 987451 (all editions).
- Wade, Wyn Craig (1988) [1987]. The Fiery Cross – The Ku Klux Klan in America. Touchstone Books, an imprint of Simon & Schuster. ISBN 978-0-671-65723-9 – via Internet Archive. LCCN 86-26002; ISBN 0-6714-1476-3; OCLC 438379075, 769475167, 438379075.
- Wallace, Jerry L. (July 14, 2014). "The Ku Klux Klan in Calvin Coolidge's America". Coolidge Blog. Plymouth, Vermont: The Calvin Coolidge Presidential Foundation. Archived from the original on August 30, 2023.
- Woolley, John Turner; Peters, Gerhard David, eds. (June 8, 1920). "Republican Party Platform of 1920". The American Presidency Project (online database). University of California at Santa Barbara. Archived from the original on April 27, 2019. LCCN 2005-616760; OCLC 57407623 ("Political Party Platforms").
- Zatarain, Michael P. "Mick" (1990). David Duke – Evolution of a Klansman. Gretna, Louisiana: Pelican Publishing Company. p. 21. ISBN 978-0-88289-817-9 – via Internet Archive. LCCN 90-7339; ISBN 0-8828-9817-5; OCLC 243443592 (all editions).

=== Government and genealogical archives ===
- Colorado State Archives (n.d.). "Statehood Governors 1907–1927 – Clarence Morley" ( (PDF)). Territorial and Statehood Governors of Colorado from 1862–2012 (PDF). Denver. Archived from the original on December 21, 2016. OCLC 53960098.

=== Sources by the Klan or known exponents of the Klan ===
- Davis, Susan Lawrence (1924). Authentic History – Ku Klux Klan, 1865–1877. Susan Lawrence Davis. p. 45 – via Internet Archive.
  Note → Susan Lawrence Davis' father, Lawrence Ripley Davis (1831–1892), had been a Confederate Colonel and founding member of the Klan (the old Klan) in Alabama. Margaret Mitchell, drew heavily from book as a source for Gone With the Wind. Davis sued Mitchell, unsuccessfully, for plagiarism.
  LCCN 24-4514 (microfilm & digital); OCLC 1072104132 (all editions).
- Dixon, Thomas Jr. (September 1905). "The Story of the Ku Klux Klan – Some of Its Leaders, Living and Dead". Metropolitan Magazine. 22 (6). New York: 657–669 – via Google Books. → "Illustrated with photographs, prints and drawings by A[rthur] I. Keller".
- Gordon, George W. (1867). Prescript of the * * [order of the Ku-Klux klan]. Pulaski, Tennessee: Lapsley D. McCord. LCCN 17005242. OCLC 1050761652 – via Internet Archive. → Printed secretly in the office of the Pulaski Citizen by its publisher, Lapsley D. McCord (1847–1920) (Horn). → This copy of the Prescript was formerly the property of Col. Martin Luther Stansel (1822–1902), a lawyer from Pickens County, Alabama, and one of the organizers of the original Ku Klux Klan → reprinted 1903 → revised 1904.
