= Anti-Catholicism in the United States =

Anti-Catholicism in the United States dates back to the colonial history of the U.S. Anti-Catholic attitudes were first brought to the Thirteen Colonies of British North America by Protestant settlers from Europe during the British colonization of the Americas. Two types of anti-Catholic rhetoric existed in colonial society and they continued to exist during the following centuries. The first type, derived from the theological heritage of the Protestant Reformation and the European wars of religion (16th–18th century), consisted of the biblical Anti-Christ and the Whore of Babylon variety and it dominated anti-Catholic thought until the late 17th century. The second type was a variety which was partially derived from xenophobic, ethnocentric, nativist, and racist sentiments and distrust of increasing waves of Catholic immigrants, particularly immigrants from Ireland, Italy, Poland, Germany, Austria and Mexico. It usually focused on the pope's control of bishops, priests, and deacons.

Historians have studied the motivations for American anti-Catholicism. The historian Arthur M. Schlesinger Sr. characterized prejudice against Catholics as "the deepest bias in the history of the American people." John Higham described anti-Catholicism as "the most luxuriant, tenacious tradition of paranoiac agitation in American history". Joseph G. Mannard says that wars reduced anti-Catholicism: "enough Catholics supported the War for Independence to erase many old myths about the inherently treasonable nature of Catholicism. ... During the Civil War, the heavy enlistments of Irish and Germans into the Union Army helped to dispel notions of immigrant and Catholic disloyalty."

During the 1970s and 1980s, the historic tensions between Evangelical Protestants and Catholics in the United States began to fade. In politics, conservative Catholics and Evangelical Protestants joined forces with the Republican Party and formed the Christian right in order to advocate conservative positions on social and cultural issues, such as opposition to gay marriage and abortion. In 2000, almost half of the members of the Republican coalition were Catholic and a large majority of the Republican coalition's non-Catholic members were White Evangelicals.

== Origins ==
American anti-Catholicism was originally derived from the theological heritage of the Protestant Reformation and the European wars of religion (16th–18th century). Because the Reformation was based on an effort to correct what was perceived as the errors and excesses of the Catholic Church, its proponents formed strong positions against the Roman clerical hierarchy in general and the Papacy in particular. These positions were held by most Protestant spokesmen in the Thirteen Colonies, including those from Calvinist, Anglican, and Lutheran traditions. Furthermore, English, Scottish, and Scots-Irish identity to a large extent was based on the opposition to Catholicism. "To be English was to be anti-Catholic", writes Robert Curran.

Many of the English colonists who settled in North America during the 17th and 18th centuries, such as the Puritans and Congregationalists, had themselves fled Europe due to religious persecution by the Church of England, whose doctrines and modes of worship they believed to be firmly rooted in Roman Catholicism. Because of this, much of early American religious culture exhibited the more extreme anti-Catholic bias of these Protestant denominations. John Tracy Ellis wrote that a "universal anti-Catholic bias was brought to Jamestown in 1607 and vigorously cultivated in all the thirteen colonies from Massachusetts to Georgia." Colonial charters and laws contained specific proscriptions against Roman Catholics having any political power. Ellis noted that a common hatred of the Roman Catholic Church could bring together Anglican and Puritan clergy and laity despite their many other disagreements.

In 1642, the English colony of Virginia enacted a law prohibiting the entry of Catholic settlers. Five years later, a similar statute was enacted by the Massachusetts Bay Colony. In 1649, the Act of Toleration was passed in the Province of Maryland, where "blasphemy and the calling of opprobrious religious names" became punishable offenses, but it was repealed in 1654 and thus Catholics were outlawed once again. By 1692, formerly Catholic Maryland overthrew its government, established the Church of England by law, and forced Catholics to pay heavy taxes towards it. They were cut off from all participation in politics and additional laws were introduced that outlawed the Mass, the church's sacraments, and Catholic schools.

Following the passage of the Quebec Act which granted Catholic emancipation and freedom of religion to Catholics in Quebec at the start of the American Revolutionary War, New Yorkers were angry about it, as they feared it would spread Catholicism around British North America, particularly in the Anglican colonies. The Act was termed one of the Intolerable Acts which sparked the American Revolution. American Patriot organizations, as a result, designed the George Rex Flag as a symbol of protest against the act and Catholicism. After the Battle of Lexington, people such as Isaac Low made claims that the King had violated his oath by allowing Catholicism in Quebec.

John Adams attended Vespers on a Sunday afternoon at a Catholic church in Philadelphia one day in 1774. He praised the sermon for teaching civic duty, and enjoyed the music, but ridiculed the rituals engaged in by the parishioners. In 1788, John Jay urged the New York Legislature to require office-holders to renounce the pope and foreign authorities "in all matters ecclesiastical as well as civil," which included both the Catholic and the Anglican churches.

Once the American Revolution was underway and independence was at hand, Virginia, Pennsylvania, and Maryland passed acts of religious toleration in 1776. George Washington, as commander of the army and as president, was a vigorous promoter of tolerance for all religious denominations. He believed religion was an important support for public order, morality and virtue. He often attended services of different denominations. He suppressed anti-Catholic celebrations in the Army.

The Patriots' reliance on Catholic France for military, financial, and diplomatic aid led to a sharp drop in the amount of anti-Catholic rhetoric. Indeed, George III replaced the Pope as the "demon" Patriots fought against. Anti-Catholicism remained strong among Loyalists, some of whom went to Canada after the war while 80% remained in the new nation. By the 1780s, Catholics were extended legal toleration in all of the New England states that previously had been so hostile, and the anti-Catholic tradition of Pope Night was discontinued. "In the midst of war and crisis, New Englanders gave up not only their allegiance to Britain but one of their most dearly held prejudices."

== 19th century ==
An anti-Catholic cartoon shows the pope's nuncio (ambassador) Archbishop Francesco Satolli in 1894, casting his controlling shadow across the U.S.

In 1836, Maria Monk's Awful Disclosures of the Hotel Dieu Nunnery in Montreal was published. It was a great commercial success and it is still being circulated today by such publishers as Jack Chick. It was discovered to be a fabrication shortly after the publication of it. It was the most prominent of many such pamphlets. Numerous ex-priests and ex-nuns were on the anti-Catholic lecture circuit with lurid tales, always involving heterosexual contacts of adults—priests and nuns with dead babies buried in the basement.

=== Immigration ===
Anti-Catholicism reached a peak in the mid nineteenth century when Protestant leaders became alarmed by the heavy influx of Catholic immigrants from Ireland and Germany. Some Protestant ministers said that the Catholic Church was the Whore of Babylon who is mentioned in the Book of Revelation.

During the 1700s and 1800s, many states in the United States allowed male non-citizens to vote. Anti-Irish Catholic sentiment and anti-German Catholic sentiment following the War of 1812 and intensifying again in the 1840s lead many states, particularly in the Northeast, to amend their constitutions to prohibit non-citizens from voting. States that banned non-citizen voting during this time included New Hampshire in 1814, Virginia in 1818, Connecticut in 1819, New Jersey in 1820, Massachusetts in 1822, Vermont in 1828, Pennsylvania in 1838, Delaware in 1831, Tennessee in 1834, Rhode Island in 1842, Illinois in 1848, Ohio and Maryland in 1851, and North Carolina in 1856.

=== Nativism ===
Propaganda from the American Protective Association, an anti-Catholic secret society, depicting the pope as the master decision-maker controlling the White House, Congress, and federal financial and publishing institutions. (Art from an 1894 book.)

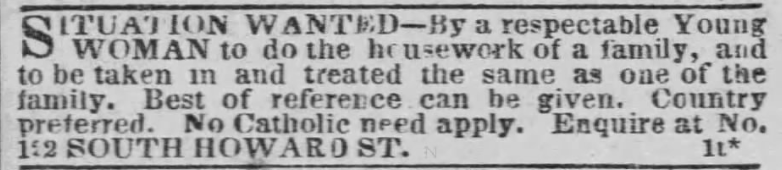
"No Catholic Need Apply" job advertisement in The Baltimore Sun, February 14, 1855.

In the 1830s and 1840s, prominent Protestant leaders, such as Lyman Beecher and Horace Bushnell, attacked the Catholic Church, not just by accusing it of being theologically unsound, they also accused it of being an enemy of the nation's republicanism. Some scholars view the rhetoric of Beecher and Bushnell as having contributed to anti-Irish and anti-Catholic attitudes.

Beecher's well-known Plea for the West (1835) urged Protestants to exclude Catholics from western settlements. The Catholic Church's official silence on the subject of slavery also garnered the enmity of northern Protestants. Intolerance became more than an attitude on August 11, 1834, when a mob set fire to an Ursuline convent in Charlestown, Massachusetts.

The resulting "nativist" movement, which acquired prominence in the 1840s, was whipped into a frenzy of anti-Catholicism which led to mob violence, the burning of Catholic property, and the killing of Catholics. This violence was fed by claims that Catholics were destroying the culture of the United States. Irish Catholic immigrants were blamed for spreading violence and drunkenness. The nativist movement found its voice in the Know-Nothing Party of the mid-1850s, a short-lived national political movement which (unsuccessfully) ran former president Millard Fillmore as its presidential candidate in 1856.

Nativist, anti-Catholic movements continued with the American Protective Association of the 1890s. This movement began in 1887, in Clinton, Iowa, to discuss the recent electoral defeat of incumbent mayor Arnold Walliker, blamed on the organized efforts of Roman Catholics in the local organized labor movement. The Association denounced various politicians as Catholic-"controlled", and claimed credit for aiding Republican electoral victories of the period.

=== Public funding of parochial schools ===
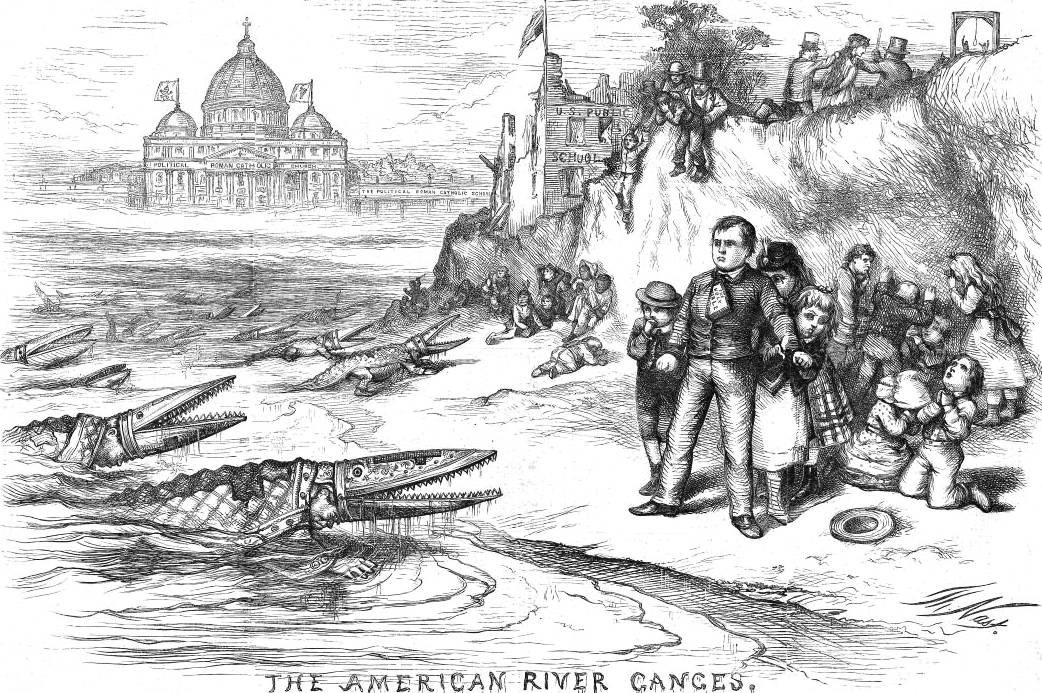
Famous 1875 editorial cartoon by Thomas Nast depicting Roman Catholic bishops as crocodiles attacking public schools, with the connivance of Irish Catholic politicians. Nast was an immigrant from Germany and ex-Catholic.

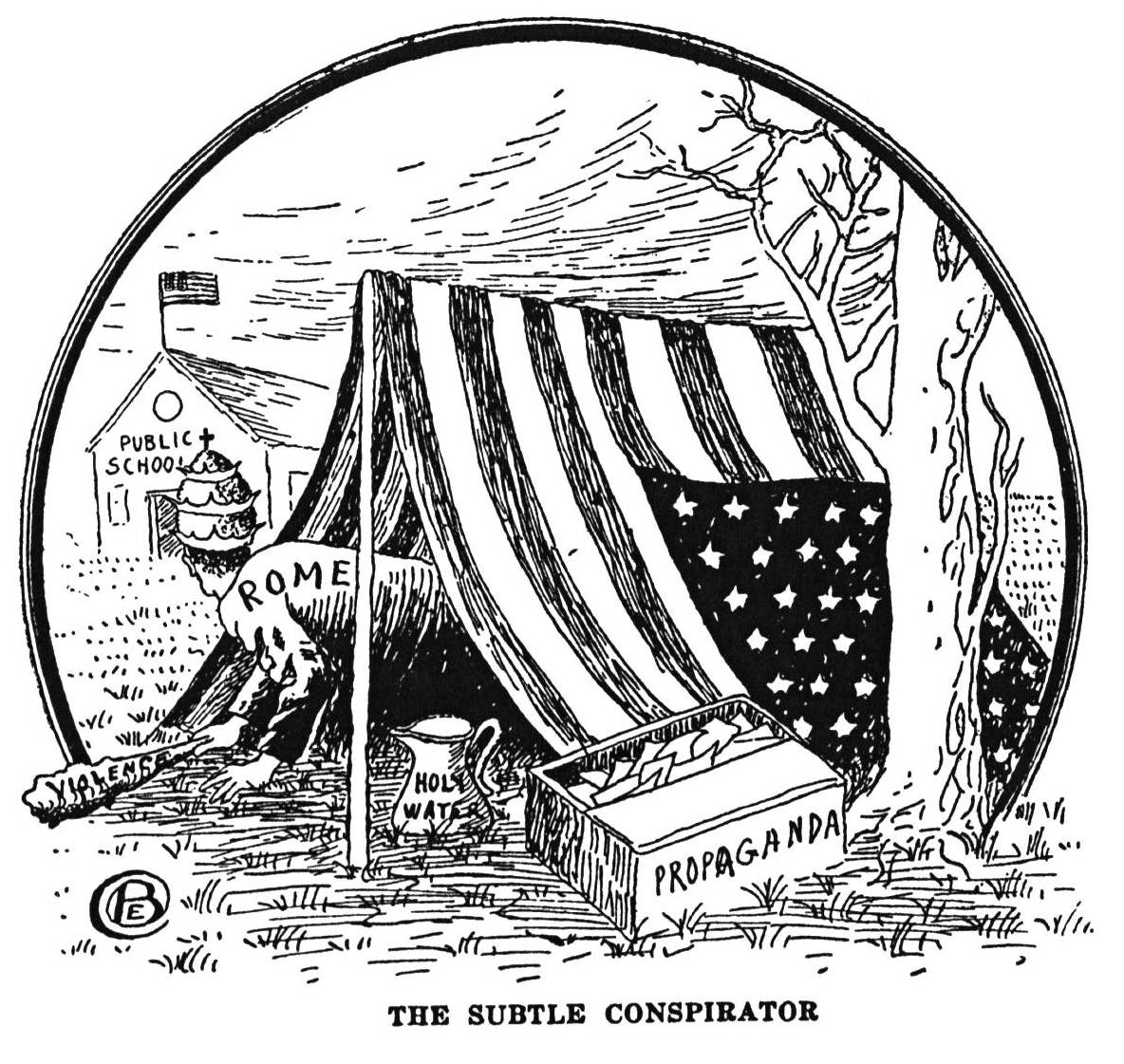
From Klansmen: Guardians of Liberty, 1926

Catholic schools began in the United States as a matter of religious and ethnic pride and as a way to insulate Catholic youth from the influence of Protestant teachers and contact with non-Catholic students.

In 1869 the religious issue in New York City escalated when Tammany Hall, with its large Catholic base, sought and obtained $1.5 million in state money for Catholic schools. Thomas Nast's cartoon The American River Ganges (above) shows Catholic bishops, directed by the Vatican, as crocodiles attacking American schoolchildren. Republican Minority Leader of the House of Representatives, James G. Blaine of Maine proposed an amendment to the US Constitution in 1874 that provided: "No money raised by taxation in any State for the support of public schools, or derived from any public source, nor any public lands devoted thereto, shall ever be under the control of any religious sect, nor shall any money so raised or land so devoted be divided between religious sects or denominations." President Ulysses S. Grant supported the Blaine Amendment. He feared a future with "patriotism and intelligence on one side and superstition, ambition and greed on the other" and called for public schools that would be "unmixed with atheistic, pagan or sectarian teaching." The amendment was defeated in 1875 but would be used as a model for so-called Blaine Amendments incorporated into 34 state constitutions over the subsequent three decades. These state-level "Blaine amendments" prohibit the use of public funds to fund parochial schools.

=== Sexual themes in literary anti-Catholicism ===
According to Marie Anne Pagliarini:

The anti-Catholic literature that appeared during 1830-60 strengthened Protestant identity and established standards for sexuality. The literature portrayed Catholicism as a threat to the ideas that comprised the "cult of domesticity" - family values, gender boundaries, and sexual norms. In particular it singled out the celibacy of priests as a sin and violation of the law of nature and assumed men's efforts to repress their sexual energy would lead inevitably to child abuse, incest, rape, and murder. The literature claimed that celibate priests, through their abuse of the confessional and the convent, threatened the sexual purity of American women.

== 20th century ==
A new appreciation of Catholicism appeared in the early 20th century that tended to neutralize anti-Catholic sentiments. In the Midwest Jacques Marquette was celebrated as a founding father of the region, with his Catholicism emphasized. In St Louis and New Orleans, both Catholic cities, a focus on the French and Catholic colonial heritage became even stronger.

In California, where Protestantism was not strong, local boosters celebrated the history of Spanish Franciscan missions. They not only preserved old missions (which had been inactive since the 1830s) but began appealing to tourists with a romantic mission story. The mission style became popular for public schools and non-Catholic colleges.

In the newly acquired Philippines, American government officials, journalists, and popular writers celebrated the Catholic missionary efforts that had transformed a "pagan" land, arguing that Filipino Catholic faith and clerical authority could aid in economic and cultural development. Future President William Howard Taft, the top American official in Manila, was a leader in the new movement. He gave a speech at the Catholic University of Notre Dame in Indiana in 1904, and praised the "enterprise, courage, and fidelity to duty that distinguished those heroes of Spain who braved the then frightful dangers of the deep to carry Christianity and European civilization into the far-off Orient." Taft, in 1909, went to California to praise Father Junípero Serra as an "apostle, legislator, [and] builder" who advanced "the beginning of civilization in California."

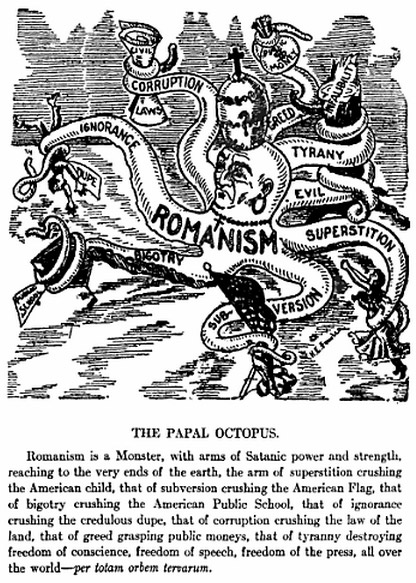
Anti-Catholic cartoon depicting the church and the pope as a malevolent octopus, from the H.E. Fowler and Jeremiah J. Crowley's 1913 anti-Catholic book, The Pope: Chief of White Slavers High Priest of Intrigue

The Menace, a weekly newspaper with a virulently anti-Catholic stance, was founded in 1911 and quickly reached a nationwide circulation of 1.5 million. The newly-established US administration in the Philippines also perceived the Catholic Church as a superstitious and anachronistic organization, seeking to diminish its influence. Examples of this policy were the attempts to restrict or ban religious instruction in public schools.

=== 1920s ===
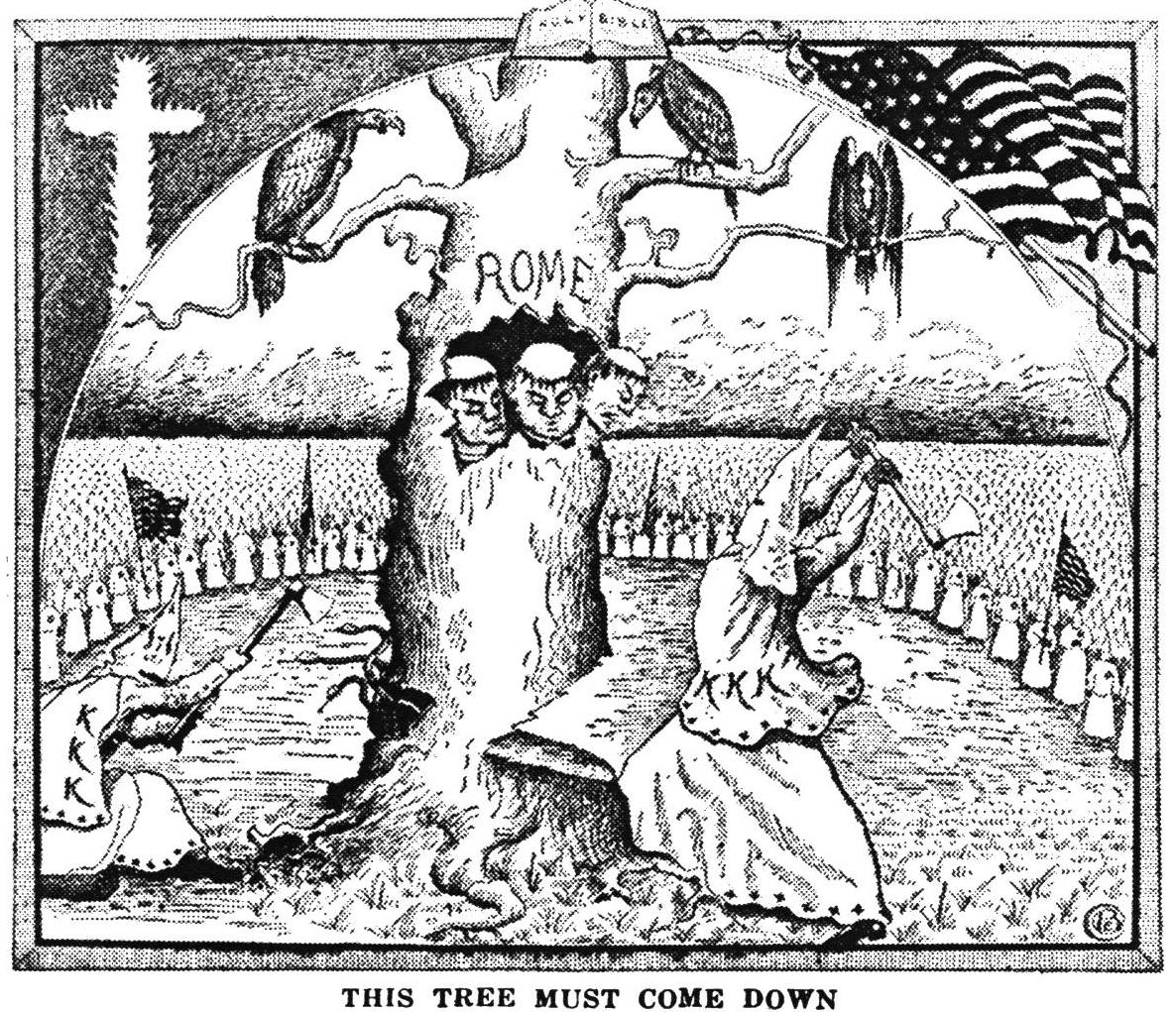
Branford Clarke illustration in The Ku Klux Klan in Prophecy 1925 by Bishop Alma White published by the Pillar of Fire Church in Zarephath, NJ

Anti-Catholicism was widespread in the 1920s; anti-Catholics, led by the Ku Klux Klan, believed that Catholicism was incompatible with democracy and that parochial schools encouraged separatism and kept Catholics from becoming loyal Americans. The Catholics responded to such prejudices by repeatedly asserting their rights as American citizens and by arguing that they, not the nativists (anti-Catholics), were true patriots since they believed in the right to freedom of religion.

With the rapid growth of the second Ku Klux Klan (KKK) 1921–25, anti-Catholic rhetoric intensified. The Catholic Church of the Little Flower was first built in 1925 in Royal Oak, Michigan, a largely Protestant town. Two weeks after it opened, the Ku Klux Klan burned a cross in front of the church.

On August 11, 1921, Father James Coyle was fatally shot on his rectory porch in Birmingham, Alabama. The shooter was Rev. E. R. Stephenson, a Southern Methodist Episcopal minister and a member of the Ku Klux Klan. The murder occurred just hours after Coyle had performed a wedding between Stephenson's daughter, Ruth, and Pedro Gussman, an American from Puerto Rico. Several months before the wedding, Ruth had enraged her father by converting to Roman Catholicism. Stephenson was defended by Hugo Black, a future Justice of the Supreme Court.

Father James Coyle, a Roman Catholic priest, was assassinated by a member of the Ku Klux Klan in Birmingham, Alabama, on August 11, 1921.

In Alabama, Hugo Black was elected to the U.S. Senate in 1926 after he had built a political base in part through his delivery of 148 speeches at local Klan gatherings, where his focus was the denunciation of Catholicism. Howard Ball characterizes Black as having "sympathized with the [Klan's] economic, nativist, and anti-Catholic beliefs." As a Supreme Court justice, Black has been accused of letting his anti-Catholic bias influence key decisions regarding the separation of church and state. For example, Christianity Today editorialized that, "Black's advocacy of church-state separation, in turn, found its roots in the fierce anti-Catholicism of the Masons and the Ku Klux Klan (Black was a Kladd of the Klavern, or an initiator of new members, in his home state of Alabama in the early 1920s)." A leading Constitutional scholar, Professor Philip Hamburger of Columbia University Law School, has strongly called into question Black's integrity on the church-state issue because of his close ties to the KKK. Hamburger argues that his views on the need for separation of Church and State were deeply tainted by his membership in the Ku Klux Klan, a vehemently anti-Catholic organization.

=== Supreme Court upholds parochial schools ===
In 1922, the voters of Oregon passed an initiative amending Oregon Law Section 5259, the Compulsory Education Act. The law unofficially became known as the Oregon School Law. The citizens' initiative was primarily aimed at eliminating parochial schools, including Catholic schools. The law caused outraged Catholics to organize locally and nationally for the right to send their children to Catholic schools. In Pierce v. Society of Sisters (1925), the United States Supreme Court declared the Oregon's Compulsory Education Act unconstitutional in a ruling that has been called "the Magna Carta of the parochial school system."

=== 1928 presidential election ===
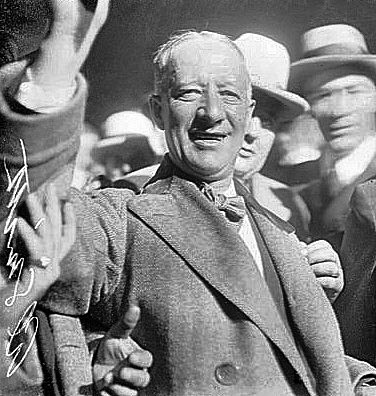
Al Smith was a Catholic of Irish, Italian and German ancestry; most voters considered him to be Irish.

The Good Citizen Nov 1926, published by Pillar of Fire Church

The Klan collapsed in the mid-1920s. It had been denounced by most newspapers and had few prominent defenders. It was disgraced by scandals at high levels and weakened by its pyramid scheme system whereby organizers collected fees and then abandoned local chapters. By 1930 only a few small local chapters survived. No later national nativist organization ever achieved even a tiny fraction of the Klan membership.

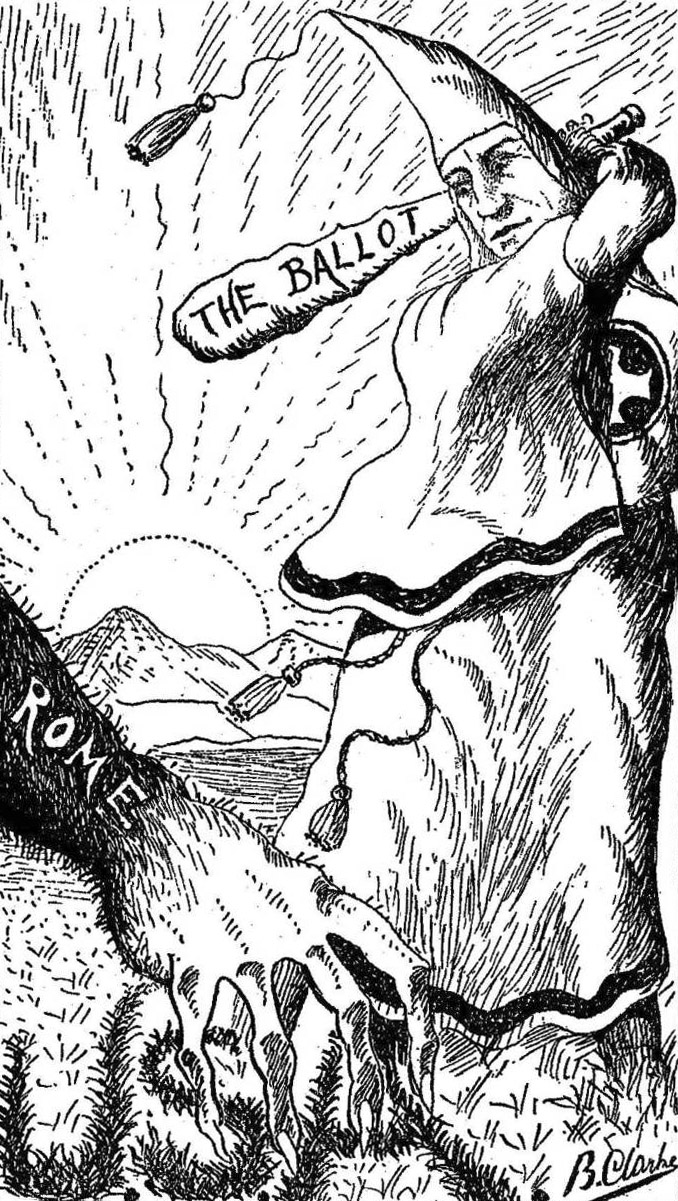
Rev. Branford Clarke illustration in Heroes of the Fiery Cross 1928 by Bishop Alma White, published by the Pillar of Fire Church in Zarephath, NJ

In 1928, Democrat Al Smith became the first Roman Catholic to gain a major party's nomination for president, and his religion became an issue during the campaign. His nomination made anti-Catholicism a rallying point especially for Lutheran and Southern Baptist ministers. They warned that national autonomy would be threatened because Smith would be listening not to the American people but to secret orders from the pope. There were rumors the pope would move to the United States to control his new realm.

Across the country, and especially in strongholds of the Lutheran, Baptist and Fundamentalist churches, Protestant ministers spoke out. They seldom endorsed Republican Herbert Hoover, who was a Quaker. More often they alleged Smith was unacceptable. A survey of 8,500 Southern Methodist ministers found only four who publicly supported Smith. Many Americans who sincerely rejected bigotry and the Klan justified their opposition to Smith because they believed the Catholic Church was an "un-American" and "alien" culture that opposed freedom and democracy. The National Lutheran Editors' and Managers' Association opposed Smith's election in a manifesto written by Dr. Clarence Reinhold Tappert. It warned about "the peculiar relation in which a faithful Catholic stands and the absolute allegiance he owes to a 'foreign sovereign' who does not only 'claim' supremacy also in secular affairs as a matter of principle and theory but who, time and again, has endeavored to put this claim into practical operation." The Catholic Church, the manifesto asserted, was hostile to American principles of separation of church and state and of religious toleration. Prohibition had widespread support in rural Protestant towns, and Smith's wet position, as well as his long-time sponsorship by Tammany Hall compounded his difficulties there. He was weakest in the border states; the day after Smith gave a talk pleaded for brotherhood in Oklahoma City, the same auditorium was jammed for an evangelist who lectured on "Al Smith and the Forces of Hell." Smith picked Senator Joe Robinson, a prominent Arkansas Senator, as his running mate. Efforts by Senator Tom Heflin to recycle his long-standing attacks on the pope failed in Alabama. Smith's strong anti-Klan position resonated across the country with voters who thought the KKK was a real threat to democracy. When the pro-Smith Democrats raised the race issue against the Republicans, they were able to contain their losses in areas with black majorities but where only whites voted. Smith carried most of the Deep South—long identified with anti-Catholicism-although losing the periphery. After 1928, the Solid South returned to the Democratic fold. One long-term result was a surge in Democratic voting in large cities, as ethnic Catholics went to the polls to defend their religious culture, often bringing women to the polls for the first time. The nation's twelve largest cities gave pluralities of 1.6 million to the GOP in 1920, and 1.3 million in 1924; now they went for Smith by a razor-thin 38,000 votes, while everywhere else was for Hoover. The surge proved permanent; Catholics made up a major portion of the New Deal Coalition that Franklin D. Roosevelt assembled and which dominated national elections for decades.

=== New Deal ===
President Franklin D. Roosevelt depended heavily in his four elections on the Catholic vote and the enthusiasm of Irish-led Democratic machines in most major cities, especially New York, Boston, Philadelphia, Pittsburgh, St Louis, Kansas City, Chicago, and Detroit. At the grassroots, Catholic bishops, priests and pastors gave very strong support to Roosevelt in the New Deal. On election day Catholic turnout soared and it overlapped heavily with the rapidly growing labor unions which organized workers to support Roosevelt. The Gallup poll found 78% of Catholics voted for FDR in 1936.

At the elite level Al Smith and many of Smith's business associates broke with FDR and formed the American Liberty League, which represented big business opposition to the New Deal. Catholic radio priest Charles Coughlin supported FDR in 1932-1934, but broke with him in 1935 and made strident attacks. There were few senior Catholics in the New Deal. Postmaster General James Farley handled patronage and broke with FDR in 1940. He was replaced by another Catholic, Frank C. Walker. Ambassador Joseph P. Kennedy Sr. was on the verge of breaking in 1940 on foreign policy but finally supported FDR in the interest of his sons.

In foreign policy the Catholics demanded American neutrality regarding the Spanish Civil War, and were joined by isolationists. Liberals wanted Washington to help the anti-Catholic Loyalist cause, but FDR kept the nation neutral.

The second serious tension arose with the renewed anti-Catholic campaign in Mexico. American Catholics bitterly attacked Ambassador Josephus Daniels for failing to combat the virulent attacks on the Catholic Church by the Mexican government. Daniels was a staunch Methodist and worked well with Catholics in the U.S., but he had little sympathy for the church in Mexico, feeling it represented the landed aristocracy that stood opposed to his version of liberalism. For the same reason he supported the Loyalist cause in the Spanish Civil War, which was even more intensely anti-Catholic. The main issue was the government's efforts to shut down Catholic schools in Mexico; Daniels publicly approved the attacks, and saluted virulently anti-Catholic Mexican politicians. In a July 1934 speech at the American Embassy, Daniels praised the anti-Catholic efforts led by former president Calles:

General Calles sees, as Jefferson saw, that no people can be both free and ignorant. Therefore, he and President Rodriguez, President-elect Cairdenas and all forward-looking leaders are placing public education as the paramount duty of the country. They all recognize that General Calles issued a challenge that goes to the very root of the settlement of all problems of tomorrow when he said: "We must enter and take possession of the mind of childhood, the mind of youth."

In 1935, Senator William Borah of Idaho, the chief Republican specialist on foreign policy, called for a Senate investigation of anti-Catholic government policies in Mexico. He came under a barrage of attacks from leading Protestant organizations, including the Federal Council of Churches, the Episcopal Church, and the board of foreign missions of the Methodist Church. There was no Senate investigation. A call for an investigation signed by 250 members of the House was blocked by Roosevelt. The Knights of Columbus began attacking Roosevelt. The crisis ended with Mexico turning away from the Calles hard line policies, perhaps in response to Daniels's backstage efforts. Roosevelt easily won all the Catholic strongholds in his 1936 landslide.

=== World War II ===
World War II was the decisive event that brought religious tolerance to the front in American life. Bruscino says "the military had developed personnel policies that actively and completely mixed America's diverse white ethnic and religious population." The sudden removal from the comforts of home, the often degrading and humiliating experiences of military life, and the unit- and friendship-building of training leveled the men. The activities meant to fill time in support of the military reminded the men of all they had in common as Americans. Under fire, the men survived by leaning on buddies, regardless of their ethnicity or religion. After coming home, the veterans helped reshape American society. Brucino says that they used their positions of power "to increase ethnic and religious tolerance. The sea change in ethnic and religious relations in the United States came from the military experience in World War II. The war remade the nation. The nation was forged in war."

=== Mid-1940s ===
In 1946, the judge David A Rose, called upon Boston's attorney general to investigate anti-Catholic and anti-Jewish alleged activities and publications of the Anglo-Saxon Federation of America.

=== Elites: Vice President Wallace, Eleanor Roosevelt and Paul Blanshard ===
At the elite level, tolerance of Catholicism was more problematic. Henry A. Wallace, Roosevelt's vice-president in 1941–1945, did not go public with his anti-Catholicism, but he often expounded it in his diary, especially during and after World War II. He briefly attended a Catholic church in the 1920s, and was disillusioned by what he perceived to be the intellectual straitjacket of Thomism. By the 1940s, he worried that certain "bigoted Catholics" were scheming to take control of the Democratic Party; indeed the Catholic big city bosses in 1944 played a major role in denying him renomination as vice president. He confided in his diary that it was "increasingly clear" that the State Department intended "to save American boys lives by handing the world over to the Catholic Church and saving it from communism." In 1949, Wallace opposed NATO, warning that "certain elements in the hierarchy of the Catholic Church" were involved in a pro-war hysteria. Defeated for the presidency in his third-party run in 1948, Wallace blamed the UK's Conservative Party, the Catholic Church, capitalism, and various others forces for his overwhelming defeat.

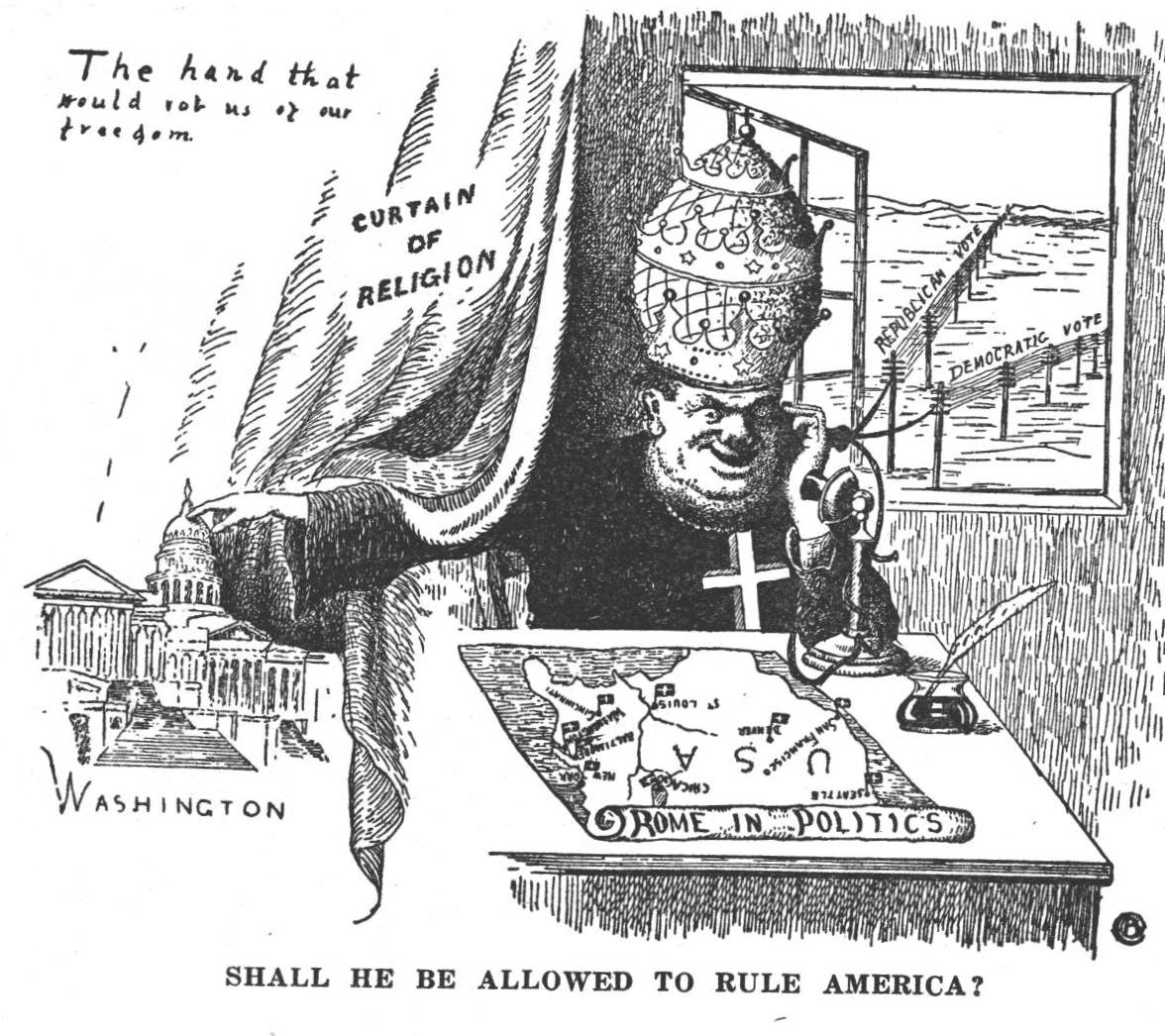
Guardians of Liberty, an anti-Catholic caricature by the Ku Klux Klan-affiliate Alma White (1943), founder and bishop of the Pillar of Fire Church.

Eleanor Roosevelt, the president's widow, and other New Deal liberals who were fighting Irish-dominated Democratic parties, feuded publicly with church leaders on national policy. They accused her of being anti-Catholic. In July 1949, Roosevelt had a public disagreement with Francis Joseph Spellman, the Catholic Archbishop of New York, which was characterized as "a battle still remembered for its vehemence and hostility". In her columns, Roosevelt had attacked proposals for federal funding of certain nonreligious activities at parochial schools, such as bus transportation for students. Spellman cited the Supreme Court's decision which upheld such provisions, accusing her of anti-Catholicism. Most Democrats rallied behind Roosevelt, and Spellman eventually met with her at her Hyde Park home to quell the dispute. However, Roosevelt maintained her belief that Catholic schools should not receive federal aid, evidently heeding the writings of secularists such as Paul Blanshard. Privately, Roosevelt said that if the Catholic Church gained school aid, "Once that is done they control the schools, or at least a great part of them."

During the Spanish Civil War in the late 1930s, Eleanor Roosevelt favored the republican Loyalists against General Francisco Franco's Nationalists; after 1945, she opposed normalizing relations with Spain. She told Spellman bluntly that "I cannot however say that in European countries the control by the Roman Catholic Church of great areas of land has always led to happiness for the people of those countries." Her son Elliott Roosevelt suggested that her "reservations about Catholicism" were rooted in her husband's sexual affairs with Lucy Mercer and Missy LeHand, who were both Catholics.

Roosevelt's biographer Joseph P. Lash denies that she was anti-Catholic, citing her public support of Al Smith, a Catholic, in the 1928 presidential campaign and her statement to a New York Times reporter that year quoting her uncle, President Theodore Roosevelt, in expressing "the hope to see the day when a Catholic or a Jew would become president".

In 1949, Paul Blanshard wrote in his bestselling book American Freedom and Catholic Power that America had a "Catholic Problem". He stated that the church was an "undemocratic system of alien control" in which the lay were chained by the "absolute rule of the clergy." In 1951, in Communism, Democracy, and Catholic Power, he compared Rome with Moscow as "two alien and undemocratic centers", including "thought control".

Professor Daniel Dreisbach argues regarding the organization Protestants and other Americans United for the Separation of Church and State:

In the mid-20th century, the rhetoric of separation was revived and ultimately constitutionalized by anti-Catholic elites, such as ... Protestants and other Americans United for the Separation of Church and State ... who feared the influence and wealth of the Catholic Church and perceived parochial education as a threat to public schools and democratic values.

=== 1950s ===
On October 20, 1951, President Harry Truman nominated former General Mark Clark to be the United States emissary to the Vatican. Clark was forced to withdraw his nomination on January 13, 1952, following protests from Texas Senator Tom Connally and Protestant groups.

In the 1950s prejudices against Catholics could still be heard from some Protestant ministers, but national leaders increasingly tried to build up a common front against communism and stressed the common values shared by Protestants, Catholics and Jews. Leaders like Dwight D. Eisenhower emphasized how Judeo-Christian values were a central component of American national identity.

=== 1960 election ===
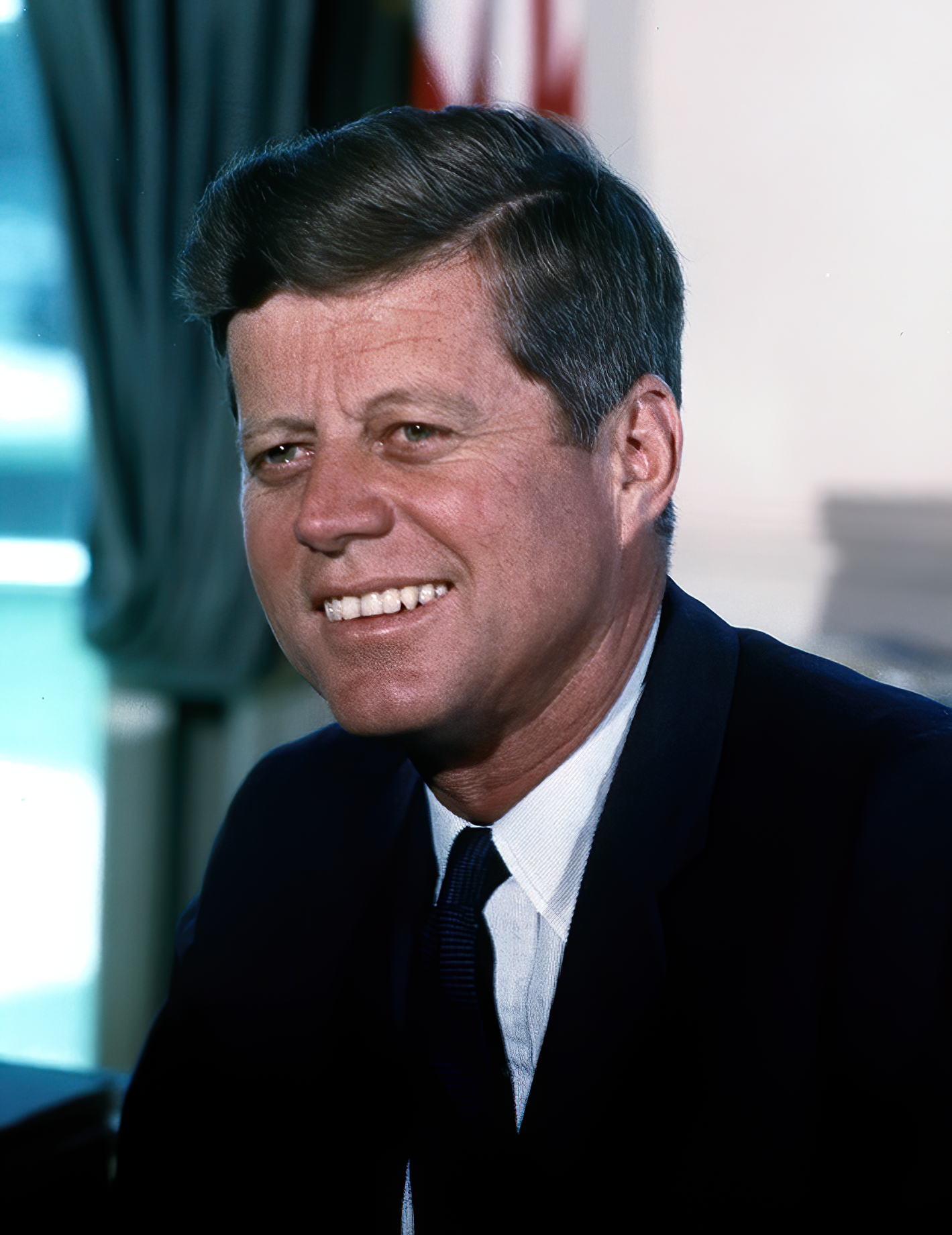
John F. Kennedy, first Catholic President, elected 1960.

A key factor that affected the vote for and against John F. Kennedy in his 1960 campaign for the presidency of the United States was his Catholic faith. Catholics mobilized and gave Kennedy from 75 to 80 percent of their votes.

Prominent Protestant spokesmen, led by Billy Graham and Norman Vincent Peale, organized Protestant ministers by warning them that the pope would be giving orders to a Kennedy White House. Many established Evangelical groups were mobilized. Two organizations took active roles, the National Conference of Citizens for Religious Freedom and Protestants and Other Americans United for Separation of Church and State. Peale was blasted by the media for his anti-Catholicism and in response, he retreated, denying the facts of his organizing role. Graham pushed hard against Kennedy, keeping Nixon informed about his progress.

To allay the fears of Protestants, Kennedy kept his distance from Catholic Church officials and in a highly publicized speech, he told the Protestant ministers of the Greater Houston Ministerial Association on September 12, 1960, "I am not the Catholic candidate for President. I am the Democratic Party's candidate for President who also happens to be a Catholic. I do not speak for my Church on public matters – and the Church does not speak for me." He promised to respect the separation of church and state and not to allow church officials to dictate public policy to him. Kennedy counterattacked by suggesting that it was bigotry to relegate one-quarter of all Americans to second-class citizenship just because they were Catholic. In the final count, the additions and subtractions to Kennedy's vote because of religion probably canceled out. He won a close election; The New York Times reported a "narrow consensus" among the experts that Kennedy had won more than he lost as a result of his Catholicism, as Catholics flocked to Kennedy to demonstrate their group solidarity in demanding political equality.

Concern about Catholic power and influence did not disappear with Kennedy's victory in 1960. Many Protestants would not take the Democratic candidate at his word. That was still apparent in 1961 and 1962 as the Kennedy Administration navigated treacherous issues like federal aid to education and Peace Corps contracts. Only gradually, by living up to his campaign pledges, could the president appease fears about the Catholic Church's role in politics. The Second Council of the Vatican and the sense that the church was reforming itself also helped diminish bigotry. The rise of more pressing issues – the campaign for racial equality and the Vietnam War – and the prospect of new political alliances had the same effect. Anti-Catholicism did not undermine William E. Miller's vice-presidential nomination in 1964 nor did it undermine Robert Kennedy's bid for the Democratic presidential in 1968.

== Late 20th–early 21st century ==
After the 1980 United States presidential election, the historic tensions between Evangelical Protestants and Roman Catholics faded dramatically. In politics, the two factions often joined forces with the Republican Party and formed the Christian right in order to advocate conservative positions on social and cultural issues, such as opposition to gay marriage and abortion. Both groups held tightly to traditional moral values and increasingly opposed secularization. Ronald Reagan was especially popular among both White Evangelicals and ethnic Catholics, known as Reagan Democrats. By the year 2000, the Republican coalition included about half the Roman Catholics and a large majority of White Evangelicals.

In 1980, The New York Times warned the Catholic bishops that if they followed the instructions of the Catholic Church and denied communion to politicians who advocated a pro-choice stance regarding abortion, they would be "imposing a test of religious loyalty" that might jeopardize "the truce of tolerance by which Americans maintain civility and enlarge religious liberty".

Starting in 1993, members of Historic Adventist splinter groups paid to have anti-Catholic billboards that called the pope the Anti-Christ placed in various cities on the West Coast, along Interstate 5 from Portland to Medford, Oregon, as well as in Albuquerque, New Mexico. One such group posted an anti-Catholic ad in The Oregonian on Easter Sunday, in 2000, as well as in newspapers in Coos Bay, Oregon, and newspapers in Longview and Vancouver, Washington. Mainstream Seventh-day Adventists denounced the advertisements. The contract for the last of the billboards in Oregon ran out in 2002.

Philip Jenkins, an Episcopalian historian, maintains that some who otherwise avoid offending members of racial, religious, ethnic or gender groups have no reservations about venting their hatred of Catholics.

In May 2006, a Gallup poll found that 57% of Americans had a favorable view of the Catholic faith, while 30% of Americans had an unfavorable view of it. The Catholic Church's doctrines, and the priest sex abuse scandal were top issues for those who disapproved. The church's view on homosexuality, and the celibate priesthood were low on the list of grievances for those who held an unfavorable view of Catholicism. A slightly higher unfavorable view of the Catholic Church was the common preaching of poverty theology which was in stark contrast to the splendor of the Vatican. While Protestants and Catholics themselves had a majority with a favorable view, those who are not Christian or are irreligious had a majority with an unfavorable view.

In April 2008, Gallup found that the number of Americans who stated that they had a positive view of U.S. Catholics had shrunk to 45% and 13% of them stated that they had a negative opinion. A substantial proportion of Americans, 41%, stated that their view of Catholics was neutral, while 2% of Americans stated that they had a "very negative" view of Roman Catholics. However, with a net positive opinion of 32%, sentiment towards Catholics was more positive than sentiment towards evangelical and fundamentalist Christians, who received net-positive opinions of 16 and 10% respectively. Gallup reported that Methodists and Baptists were viewed more positively than Catholics were, as were Jews.

In August 2012, the New York Times reviewed the religious affiliations of the nine top national leaders: the presidential and vice-presidential nominees, the Supreme Court justices, the House Speaker, and the Senate majority leader. There were nine Catholics (six justices, both vice-presidential candidates, and the Speaker), three Jews (all from the Supreme Court), two Mormons (including the Republican presidential nominee Mitt Romney) and one African-American Protestant (Democratic nominee and soon to be President Barack Obama). There were no white Protestants.

=== Increase in the number of anti-Catholic attacks ===
The United States Conference of Catholic Bishops currently maintains a list of anti-Catholic attacks which have been aimed at Catholic churches in the U.S. From May 2020 to May 2022, they reported that at least 139 incidents occurred across 35 U.S. states and the District of Columbia. These included cases of arson, beheaded statues, gravestones defaced with swastikas, smashed windows, pro-abortion graffiti, theft, and more having taken place in Catholic churches and buildings.

In 2021, The Wall Street Journal has noted that according to FBI statistics, anti-Catholic hate crimes have risen in recent years, with an annual increase since 2013. 73 anti-Catholic documented hate crimes occurred in 2020, an increase from 64 in 2019, and 51 in 2018. According to OSCE's hate crime database (ODIHR), there were 420 hate crimes against Christians in 2022, the most out of any religious group after Jews. This report includes anti-Catholic hate crimes.

On August 27, 2025, a mass shooting targeting Annunciation Catholic Church in Minneapolis resulted in the death of two Catholic school children and injured 17. The perpetrator, Robin M. Westman, died of a self-inflicted gunshot wound. Westman was transgender and attended the church’s adjoining school in the past. The FBI is investigating the shooting as an anti-Catholic hate crime and as an act of domestic terrorism.

=== Human sexuality, contraception, abortion ===
The Catholic Church generally teaches the belief that acts of homosexuality, abortion, and contraception are sinful. Such views have sparked anti-Catholic activism.

On December 10, 1989, members of ACT UP and WHAM disrupted a Sunday Mass led by Cardinal John O'Connor at St. Patrick's Cathedral, New York. While O'Connor was sympathetic towards and provided care to those suffering from HIV/AIDS, he maintained a belief that condoms shouldn't be promoted or distributed, even as a prophylactic. This stance was a contributing factor to the tensions between his church and local advocacy groups. 111 protestors were arrested after shouting and generally disrupting the service.

=== Anti-Catholicism in the entertainment industry ===
Miramax, a company run by producer and convicted sexual predator Harvey Weinstein, has been accused of spreading anti-Catholic propaganda.

According to the Jesuit priest James Martin, the U.S. entertainment industry is of "two minds" about the Catholic Church. He argues that:

On the one hand, film and television producers seem to find Catholicism irresistible. There are a number of reasons for this. First, more than any other Christian denomination, the Catholic Church is supremely visual, and therefore attractive to producers and directors concerned with the visual image. Vestments, monstrances, statues, crucifixes – to say nothing of the symbols of the sacraments – are all things that more "word oriented" Christian denominations have foregone. The Catholic Church, therefore, lends itself perfectly to the visual media of film and television. You can be sure that any movie about the Second Coming or Satan or demonic possession or, for that matter, any sort of irruption of the transcendent into everyday life, will choose the Catholic Church as its venue. (See, for example, "End of Days," "Dogma" or "Stigmata.")

Second, the Catholic Church is still seen as profoundly "other" in modern culture and therefore, it is an object of continuing fascination. As already noted, it is ancient in a culture that celebrates the new, professes truths in a postmodern culture that looks skeptically on any claim to truth, and speaks about mystery in a rational, post-Enlightenment world. Therefore, it is the perfect context for scriptwriters who are searching for the "conflict" which is required in any story.

He argues that despite its fascination with the Catholic Church, the entertainment industry also treats the church with contempt. "It is as if producers, directors, playwrights and filmmakers feel obliged to establish their intellectual bona fides by trumpeting their differences with the institution that holds them in such thrall."

== See also ==
- Catholic–Protestant relations
- Religion in the United States
  - Freedom of religion in the United States
  - History of religion in the United States
    - History of Christianity in the United States
      - History of the Catholic Church in the United States
      - History of Protestantism in the United States
- Discrimination in the United States
  - Religious discrimination in the United States
    - Know-Nothing Riots in United States politics
    - Know Nothing
- Nativism (politics) § United States
  - Nativism in United States politics
- Racism in the United States
- Xenophobia § United States
  - Xenophobia in the United States
    - Anti-French sentiment
    - Anti-Irish sentiment
    - Anti-Italianism
    - Anti-Mexican sentiment
    - Anti-Polish sentiment
    - Anti-Slavic sentiment
    - Anti-Spanish sentiment
