= Spencer Salisbury =

Spencer Salisbury was a war buddy and business partner of Harry S. Truman. Salisbury, along with Edgar Hinde, convinced Truman to apply for membership in the Ku Klux Klan in 1924. Salisbury claimed that Truman was actually initiated into the Klan, in contradiction to Hinde and Truman, who stated that Truman backed out and was refunded his $10 initiation fee.

Later, Salisbury and Truman became bitter enemies. Salisbury states that Truman attempted "to give Jim Pendergast control of [their] business." Salisbury began attacking Truman's patrons, the Pendergast machine, for corruption, and Truman retaliated by telegramming the Federal Home Loan Bank system about Salisbury, leading to Salisbury's conviction for filing a false affidavit. For this reason, doubt has been cast on Salisbury's version of Truman's flirtation with the Klan.
