= Alonzo Hamby =

American historian and academic (born 1940)

- Born: Alonzo L. Hamby; January 30, 1940 (age 86); Missouri, United States
- Occupations: Historian, academic

Alonzo L. Hamby (born January 30, 1940) is an American historian and academic. He is distinguished professor of history emeritus at Ohio University and the recipient of two National Endowment for the Humanities Fellowships, a Harry S. Truman Library Institute Senior Fellowship, a Woodrow Wilson International Center for Scholars Fellowship, and the Ohio Academy of History Distinguished Service Award. He is an expert on Harry S. Truman and his presidency.

== Life ==
Hamby was born on 30 January 1940. He was born and raised at Humansville, Polk County, Missouri.

== Career ==
Hamby completed his PhD from the University of Missouri. He is distinguished professor of history emeritus at Ohio University. Hamby is also a distinguished member of the American Historical Association.

== Bibliography ==
External videos
- Organization of American Historians panel on Truman biographies, including Robert Ferrell's Harry S. Truman: A Life, Alonzo Hamby's Man of the People: A Life of Harry S. Truman and David McCullough's Truman.", C-SPAN

His books include:

- Liberalism and Its Challengers: From F.D.R. to Bush
- Man of Destiny: FDR and the Making of the American Century
- Man of the People: A Life of Harry S. Truman
- For the Survival of Democracy: Franklin Roosevelt and the World Crisis of the 1930s
- Beyond the New Deal: Harry S. Truman and American Liberalism
- The Imperial Years
- Harry S. Truman and the Fair Deal
- The New Deal: Analysis & Interpretation
