= Alfred Steinberg =

American journalist

Alfred Steinberg (December 8, 1917 – February 6, 1995) was an American historian and biographer who, during his prolific career, wrote 20 books on American history and 200 magazine articles for Reader's Digest, Collier's Weekly and Harper's, among others. His books included biographies of Eleanor Roosevelt (Mrs. R), Presidents Harry Truman (The Man From Missouri) and Lyndon Johnson (Sam Johnson's Boy), Senator Tom Connally, House Speaker Sam Rayburn (Sam Rayburn), the first ten Presidents of the United States (The First Ten), and the political bosses who ruled the American political machines that dominated in the 1920s and 1930s (The Bosses). His twelve books for the Lives to Remember Series included biographies of Herbert Hoover, James Madison, John Adams, Woodrow Wilson, Douglas MacArthur, the Kennedy brothers, Admiral Richard Byrd and Daniel Webster. His magazine articles told about not only the Washington political landscape but nearly every aspect of the American experience.

== Biography ==
Steinberg was born in 1917 in St. Paul, Minnesota. He entered the University of Minnesota at 16 and graduated with both undergraduate and master's degrees in Political Science and Economics. He moved to Washington, D.C., in 1940 with his wife also a University of Minnesota graduate (Economics) to work for the Federal government. His began his literary career in 1948 with his magazine article on the unlawful internment of Japanese-American citizens during World War II. His work was known for in depth original research and the ability to condense vast amounts of information into interesting and highly readable narrations. He died of a stroke on February 6, 1995, in Silver Spring, Maryland.
