= David Mark Chalmers =

American historian (1927–2020)

- Born: 1927; Washington, D.C., U.S.
- Died: October 25, 2020; Gainesville, Florida, U.S.
- Citizenship: American
- Known for: Hooded Americanism: A History of the Ku Klux Klan (1965)
- Scientific career
- Workplaces: University of Florida

David Mark Chalmers (1927 - 25 October 2020) was an American historian.

During the Second World War, Chalmers worked for the American army. After the war, he gained his Ph.D. in American history at the University of Rochester. In 1955, he started working as an assistant professor at the University of Florida where he focused much of his career on the study of American social and political history, particularly issues of racism, the Ku Klux Klan, and the struggle for civil rights. During his long career at the university, he was the chair of the University President's Faculty Educational Policy Group.

Chalmers was active in the civil rights movement. He joined the St. Augustine movement in 1964 and was arrested for participating in the protests in St. Augustine, Florida. He was in jail for a week. He was also active in demonstrations against the Vietnam War.

In 1965, he published Hooded Americanism: A History of the Ku Klux Klan. It was reprinted several times and became his most popular work.

Chalmers was married to the Canadian Jean McCormick Chalmers. They had two children.

== Publications ==
- The social and political ideas of the muckrakers (1964)
- The history of the Standard Oil Company with Ida Minerva Tarbell (1966)
- The muckrake years (1974)
- Neither socialism nor monopoly: Theodore Roosevelt and the decision to regulate the railroads (1976)
- Hooded Americanism: the history of the Ku Klux Klan (1987)
- And the crooked places made straight: the struggle for social change in the 1960s (1991)
- Backfire: how the Ku Klux Klan helped the civil rights movement (2003)
