= Stanley Horn =

American historian (1889–1980)

Stanley Fitzgerald Horn (May 27, 1889 – 1980) was an American historian, businessman, and editor. He was born at Neely's Bend in Davidson County, Tennessee, on a farm that had been in his family since the eighteenth century. After graduating from high school, he started working for the Cumberland Telephone Company. In 1908, he began working for the Southern Lumberman, a trade paper on the lumber business.

Horn became interested in state and Civil War history. A lifelong admiration for Robert E. Lee resulted in Horn's first book in 1935, entitled Boys' Life of Robert E. Lee. In 1938, his book The Hermitage: Home of Old Hickory was published. Invisible Empire: The Story of the Ku Klux Klan, 1866–1871 came out the following year. In 1941, Horn published The Army of Tennessee: A Military History. In 1949, he completed The Robert E. Lee Reader. In 1956, he wrote The Decisive Battle of Nashville. In all, Horn authored and published nine books pertaining to the Civil War.

Horn served as president of the Tennessee Historical Society for fifteen years (1942–53, 1961–65). He also served as chairman of the Tennessee Civil War Commission from 1961 to 1965. When Horn retired from the Tennessee Historical Commission, Governor Buford Ellington appointed him state historian.

Among the awards Horn received was the Building Journalism Award from the National Lumber Manufacturers Association.
