= E. R. Stephenson =

American minister and Klansman (1879–1956)

Edwin Roscoe Stephenson (March 8, 1870 – August 4, 1956) was a minister of the now defunct Methodist Episcopal Church, South, and a member of the Ku Klux Klan. He shot and killed Catholic priest James Coyle on August 11, 1921, in Birmingham, Jefferson County, Alabama, but was acquitted of murder. His main lawyer was future U.S. Supreme Court Justice and future U.S. Senator, Hugo Black.

== Career ==
Stephenson was a son of William Franklin Stephenson and his wife Mary Jane Gillespie Stephenson. Born in Georgia, he had moved with his family to Alabama in 1882. He and his wife, Mary Etta Thompson Stephenson, had one child who survived infancy, a daughter, Mary Ruth Stephenson. A side-line clergyman, Stephenson worked as a barber and married people, for a fee, in the Jefferson County Court House.

== Killing of James Coyle ==
In 1921, six months after his father died, his only child, Ruth, converted to Catholicism. A well-known member of the Ku Klux Klan, he killed Coyle one hour after 18-year-old Ruth married a Catholic, 44-year-old Pedro Gussman, whose Spanish parents lived in Puerto Rico. The marriage ceremony had been performed by Father Coyle. On the afternoon of August 11, 1921, the enraged Stephenson fired three shots at Father Coyle on the porch of St. Paul's rectory. There were many witnesses who heard but did not see the actual shooting.

Stephenson turned himself in to the authorities who were located a block away. He requested that Hugo Black, a future member of the U.S. Supreme Court be his attorney because Hugo Black held anti-Catholic views (in 1923, Black would join the Klan ). The Ku Klux Klan paid for his defense by a powerful group of attorneys.

Stephenson's preliminary hearing was held on August 24, 1921. His daughter testified by stating that he had often made threats against Coyle's life. Coyle's sister and housekeeper both testified by stating that there had been no raised voices or scuffling prior to the shooting, contradicting Stephenson's claim that he had fired in self-defense after the priest threatened and assaulted him.

The trial started on October 17, 1921. The defense entered a dual plea of "not guilty and not guilty by reason of insanity", arguing that at the time of the killing, Stephenson was temporarily insane and he had acted in self-defense. The defense played on fears of racial miscegnation by trying to claim that Gussman was an African-American man, and made anti-Catholic arguments. His daughter Ruth was not called to testify as a witness during the trial.

Stephenson was acquitted and released.

== Death ==
Stephenson died on October 3, 1956, at the age of 86.

== Literature ==
- John Beecher published a poem, "Alter Christus", about Coyle's killing.
- A novelized account of the killing, by Joe Schrantz, was published by Infinity in 2004 as The Reverend's Revenge.
- A historical study by Sharon Davies was published by Oxford University Press in 2010 with the title Rising Road: A True Tale of Love, Race, and Religion in America.
- In 2021, Sheila Killian, Father Coyle's grand-niece, published her debut novel which is titled Something Bigger, the novel is about her grand-aunt Marcella Coyle, and it also describes the events which surrounded the killing
