= James Coyle =

American Catholic priest and murder victim (1873–1921)

The Reverend James Coyle
- Portrait of Coyle
- Born: James Edwin Coyle; March 23, 1873; Drum, County Roscommon, United Kingdom of Great Britain and Ireland (now Republic of Ireland)
- Died: August 11, 1921 (aged 48); Birmingham, Alabama, U.S.
- Cause of death: Murder via gunshot
- Burial place: Elmwood Cemetery
- Education: Mungret College, Limerick; Pontifical North American College
- Church: Catholic Church
- Ordained: May 30, 1896

James Edwin Coyle (March 23, 1873 – August 11, 1921) was an American Catholic priest who was murdered in Birmingham, Alabama, by a Ku Klux Klan member for performing a marriage between Pedro Gussman, a Puerto Rican Catholic, and a recent Catholic convert, Ruth Stephenson. The killer, E. R. Stephenson, was Ruth's father and opposed what he saw as an interracial union. He would ultimately be acquitted by a jury.

== Biography ==
James Edwin Coyle was born on March 23, 1873, in Drum, County Roscommon, United Kingdom of Great Britain and Ireland, to Owen Coyle and Margaret Durney. He attended Mungret College in Limerick and the Pontifical North American College in Rome, and was ordained a priest at age 23 on May 30, 1896.

Later that year, he sailed with another priest, Father Michael Henry, to Mobile, Alabama, and served under Bishop Edward Patrick Allen. He became an instructor, and later rector, of the McGill Institute for Boys. In 1904, Bishop Allen appointed Coyle to succeed Patrick O'Reilly as pastor of St. Paul's Church (later Cathedral) in Birmingham, where he was well received and loved by the congregation. Coyle was the Knights of Columbus chaplain of Birmingham, Alabama Council 635.

== Murder ==
On August 11, 1921, Coyle was fatally shot in the head on the porch of St. Paul's Rectory by E. R. Stephenson, a Southern Methodist Episcopal minister and a member of the Ku Klux Klan. There were many witnesses. The murder occurred just hours after Coyle had performed a secret wedding between Stephenson's daughter, Ruth, and Pedro Gussman, a Puerto Rican whom she had met while he was working at Stephenson's house five years earlier. Gussman had also been a customer at Stephenson's barber shop. Several months before the wedding, Ruth had converted to Catholicism.

Coyle's funeral was reportedly one of the largest ever in Birmingham and took place at St. Paul's, his former church. Coyle was buried thereafter in Birmingham's Elmwood Cemetery.

== Trial and aftermath ==
Stephenson was charged with Coyle's murder. The Ku Klux Klan paid for the defense; of the five lawyers, four were Klan members. The case was assigned to the Alabama courtroom of Judge William E. Fort, a Klansman. Hugo Black, a future Justice of the Supreme Court and a future Klansman, was also one of the defense attorneys. The Birmingham News called it the biggest trial in Alabama history.

The defense team took the unusual step of entering a dual plea of "not guilty and not guilty by reason of insanity", essentially arguing that the shooting was in self-defense, and arguing that at the time of the shooting, Stephenson was suffering from "temporary insanity". Stephenson was acquitted by one juror's vote. One of Stephenson's attorneys responded to the prosecution's assertion that Gussman was of "proud Castilian descent" by stating that "he has descended a long way".

The outcome of the murder trial of Coyle's assassin had a chilling impact on Catholics, who were the targets of Klan violence for many years to come. Nevertheless, by 1941, a Catholic writer in Birmingham would write that "the death of Coyle was the climax of the anti-Catholic feeling in Alabama. After the trial, there followed such a strong feeling of revulsion among the right-minded who before had been bogged down in blindness and indifference that slowly and almost unnoticeably the Ku Klux Klan and their ilk began to lose favor among the people".

== Legacy ==
On February 22, 2012, Bishop William H. Willimon of the North Alabama Conference of the United Methodist Church presided over a service of reconciliation and forgiveness at Highlands United Methodist Church in Birmingham.

On August 11, 2021, the 100th anniversary of the murder of Coyle, a centennial memorial Mass was held in Coyle's honor at St Paul's Cathedral. An annual Mass takes place every year at the church.

== In popular media ==
- In 2010, Coyle's great-nephew, Pat Shine, produced a documentary about the murder, A Cross in Alabama.
- In 2021, Coyle's grand-niece, Sheila Killian, wrote and published Something Bigger, telling the story of his sister, Marcella Coyle, and her relationship with her brother as well as their interactions with the world around them.
- Something Bigger was republished in 2026 by 451 Editions.
