= Historical racial and ethnic demographics of the United States =

Aspect of United States history

The racial and ethnic demographics of the United States have changed drastically throughout its history.

== Sources of data ==
During the American colonial period, British colonial officials conducted censuses in some of the Thirteen Colonies that included enumerations by race. In addition, tax lists and other reports provided additional data and information about the racial demographics of the Thirteen Colonies during this time period.

People have been enumerated by race in every United States census since the first one in 1790. Collection of data on race and ethnicity in the United States census has changed over time, including addition of new enumeration categories and changes in definitions of those categories.

== Historical trends ==
Historical estimates of the pre-Columbian 1492 population of what is now the United States vary dramatically, ranging from only 900,000 to upwards of 18 million, with the majority of estimates falling between 2 million and 5 million.[1][2]However, it is universally agreed upon by historians that the Indigenous population underwent a large decline following European contact, primarily due to Old World diseases to which natives lacked immunity, as well as violent conflict and genocide committed by European settlers. By 1800, the Native American population within the modern-day borders of the United States had declined to around 600,000, compared to a combined white and black population of over 5 million at the time.[3] The Native American population continued to decline steadily over the course of the 19th century, reaching a low of around 250,000 between 1890 and 1900.

The transatlantic slave trade had its roots prior to the discovery of the Americas. By 1471, Portuguese navigators hoping to tap the fabled Saharan gold trade had reconnoitered the West African coast as far as the Niger Delta, and traded European commodities for local crafts as well as slaves, the latter which turned out to be highly lucrative. By 1490, more than 3,000 slaves a year were transported to Portugal and Spain from Africa. Following the Spanish discovery of the New World in 1492, Spanish and Portuguese sailors began transporting enslaved Africans to their new colonies in the Caribbean, marking the start of the transatlantic slave trade.[4] The first permanent British settlement in what would become the United States was established at Jamestown, Virginia, in 1607. The first African slaves were imported to the colony of Jamestown around the year 1620, marking the beginning of the slave trade in what would become the United States. In the period between 1620 and 1866, around 388,000 slaves in total were shipped to British colonies in Northern America.[5] African Americans (Blacks) made up almost one-fifth of the United States population in 1790, but following the US abolition of the slave trade in 1808, their percentage of the total U.S. population declined in almost every census until 1930, when they reached a low point of just under 10% of the population.[6] From at least 1790 until the start of World War I, the overwhelming majority (around ninety percent) of African Americans[6] lived in the Southern United States.[7][8] In addition, before 1865, the overwhelming majority of African Americans were slaves.[6] The Great Migration throughout the 20th century (starting from World War I)[6][7] resulted in more than six million African Americans leaving the Southern U.S. (especially rural areas) and moving to other parts of the United States (especially to urban areas) due to the greater economic/job opportunities, less anti-black violence/lynchings,[9] and a smaller amount of segregation/discrimination there.[10][11] Due to the Great Migration, many large cities outside of the former Confederacy(such as New York City, Chicago, Philadelphia, Detroit, and Cleveland) experienced huge increases in the African American percentage of their total population.[10]

Whites (including Non-Hispanic Whites) have historically made up the overwhelming majority (usually between eighty and ninety percent) of the total United States population, with African-Americans making up the overwhelming majority of the non-white population for most of the nation's history.[12] The United States historically had few Hispanics and Asians, especially before the late 20th century.[12] Most Asian Americans[12] historically lived in the Western United States.[13][14] The Hispanic and Asian populations of the United States have rapidly increased in the late 20th and 21st centuries, following the passage of the Immigration and Nationality Act of 1965, which repealed racially motivated national origin quotas that had severely limited immigration from countries outside of Northwestern Europe.[15] The rise of Asian and Hispanic populations, and declining immigration from Europe in the late 20th century,[16] has seen a commensurate decline in the share of non-Hispanic Whites in the country, from over 83% of the population in 1970 to around 58% in 2020. The Native American population has seen a significant rise since 1970, the first census year where respondents could self-identify their own race instead of having it assigned by an enumerator, as individuals of partial Native American descent who were previously classified by enumerators as white or black began to self-identify as Native American.[17] The Native American population rose from around 600,000 in 1970, to over 3 million in 2020, further buoyed by immigration from Indigenous Mexican and other Indigenous Latin American communities, with around a third of the Native American population in 2020 identifying as Hispanic.

The African American percentage of the U.S. population slowly increased between 1940 and 1990, after reaching a low point of less than 10% in 1930.[2] However, since 1990, the share of African American population has held mostly steady at around 12% of the population, seeing a slight decline in the 2020 census.

== Historical data for all races and for Hispanic origin (1610–2020) ==
Racial and ethnic demographics of the United States in percentage of the population

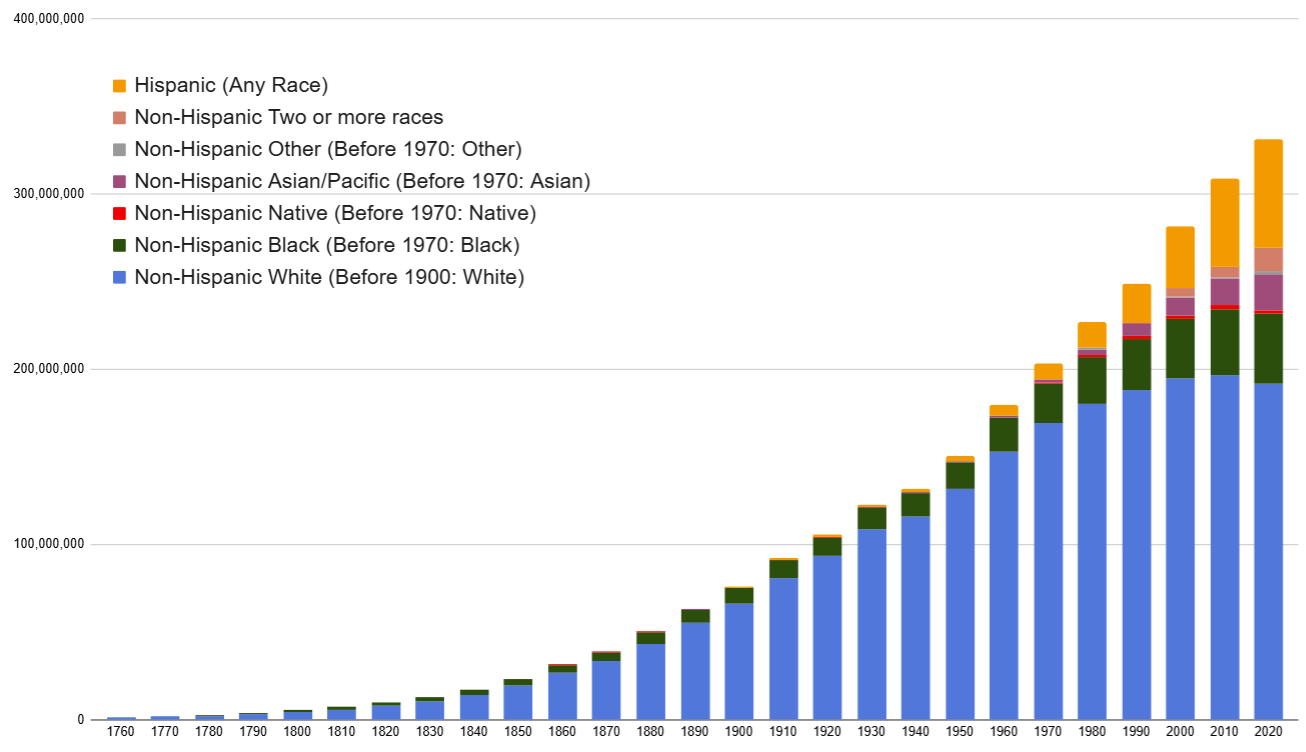
Racial and ethnic demographics of the United States in count of the population 1760-2020

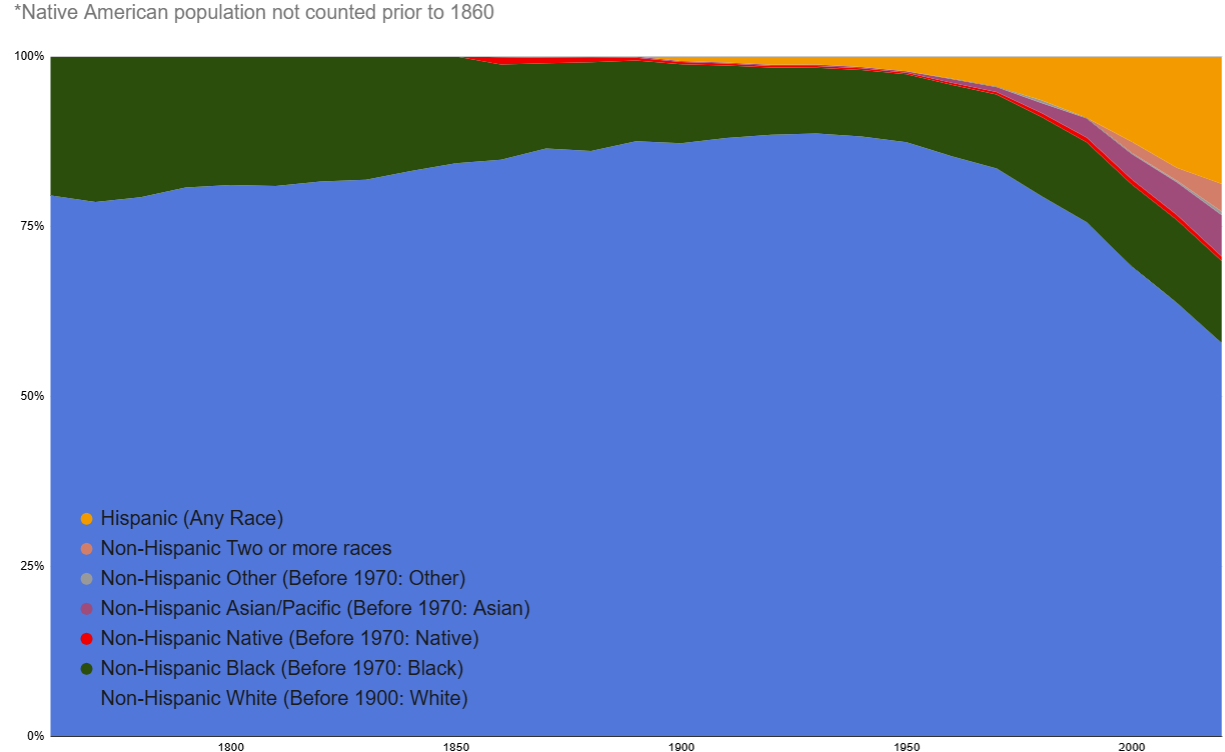
Racial and ethnic demographics of the United States in percent of the population 1760-2020

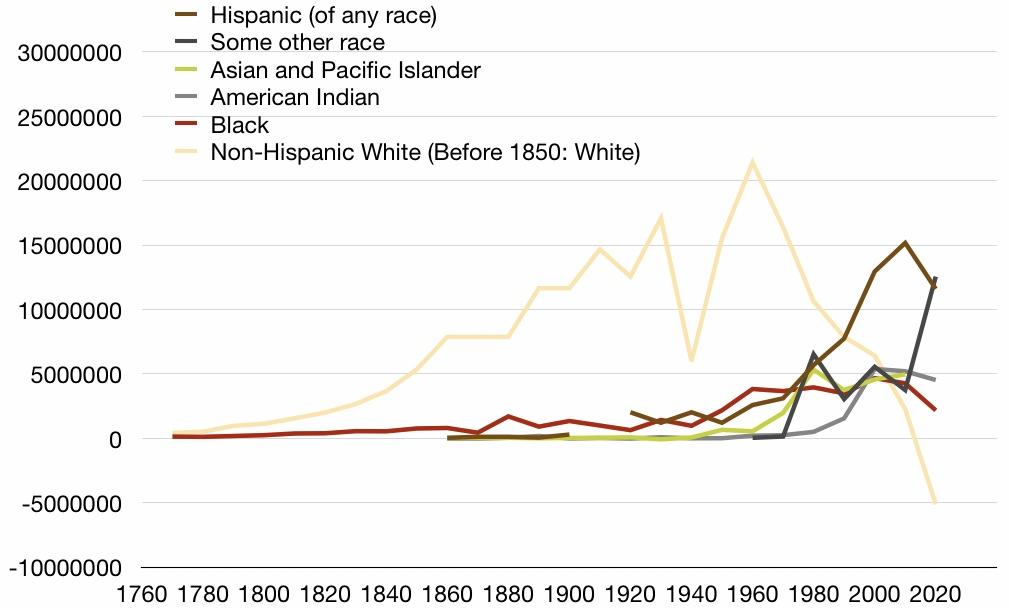
Historical decennial change in ethnic racial composition 1760-2020

The United States census enumerated Whites and Blacks since 1790, Asians and Native Americans since 1860 (though all Native Americans in the U.S. were not enumerated until 1890), "some other race" since 1950, and "two or more races" since 2000. The category of Pacific Islanders (including Native Hawaiians) was enumerated separately from Asians for the first time in 2000. Mexicans were automatically counted as White in every census from 1790 to 1960, except for 1930, unless individually deemed by enumerators as being "definitely Indian or of other non-white races." Hispanics of all races (as well as the Non-Hispanic White population) have been enumerated as an ethnic category since 1970. Some earlier estimates of the Hispanic population exist, with the population of White Hispanics estimated by the Census Bureau based on the "white population of Spanish mother tongue" in the 1940 census. Limited estimates for the Hispanic (and Non-Hispanic White) population were also made for certain years before 1940 (as well as for 1950 and 1960).

The Census Bureau has announced that for the upcoming 2030 Census, the 'race' and 'ethnicity' categories will be combined into one question, meaning that Hispanics will be classified in the same way as the already recognized racial categories, rather than as a separate ethnic classification as they were from 1970-2020. Additionally, the Census Bureau has also announced the introduction of a new "Middle Eastern or North African" racial category for the 2030 census. Middle Eastern Americans were historically counted as White on every census from 1950-2020.

Racial and Ethnic Demographics of the Thirteen Colonies (Total Numbers) Between 1610 and 1750^{[a]}
Race/Ethnic Group	1610	1620	1630	1640	1650	1660	1670	1680	1690	1700	1710	1720	1730	1740	1750
Total Population	350	2,302	4,646	26,634	50,368	75,058	111,935	151,507	210,372	250,888	331,711	466,185	629,445	905,563	1,170,760
White	350	2,282	4,586	26,037	48,768	72,138	107,400	144,536	193,643	223,071	286,845	397,346	538,424	755,539	934,340
White (%)	100.0%	99.1%	98.7%	97.8%	96.8%	96.1%	95.9%	95.4%	91.9%	88.9%	86.4%	85.2%	85.5%	83.4%	79.8%
Black (also called Negro)	0	20	60	597	1,600	2,920	4,535	6,971	16,729	27,817	44,866	68,839	91,021	150,024	236,420
Black/Negro (%)	0.0%	0.9%	1.3%	2.2%	3.2%	3.9%	4.1%	4.6%	8.1%	11.1%	13.6%	14.8%	14.5%	16.6%	20.2%

Racial and Ethnic Demographics of the Thirteen Colonies and the United States (Total Numbers) Between 1760 and 1840^{[a]}
Race/Ethnic Group	1760	1770	1780	1790	1800	1810	1820	1830	1840
Total Population	1,593,625	2,148,076	2,780,369	3,929,214	5,308,483	7,239,881	9,638,453	12,860,702	17,063,353
White	1,267,819	1,688,254	2,204,949	3,172,006	4,306,446	5,862,073	7,866,797	10,532,060	14,189,705
White %	79.6	78.6	79.3	80.7	81.1	81.0	81.6	81.9	83.2
Black (also called Negro)	325,806	459,822	575,420	757,208	1,002,037	1,377,808	1,771,656	2,328,642	2,873,648
Black/Negro %	20.4	21.4	20.7	19.3	18.9	19.0	18.4	18.1	16.8

Racial and Ethnic Demographics of the United States (Total Numbers) Between 1850 and 1920^{[c]}
Race/Ethnic Group	1850	1860	1870	1880	1890	1900	1910	1920
Total Population	23,191,876	31,443,321	38,558,371	50,155,783	62,947,714	75,994,575	91,972,266	105,710,620
White	19,553,068	26,922,537	33,589,377	43,402,970	55,101,258	66,809,196	81,731,957	94,820,915
Black	3,638,808	4,441,830	4,880,009	6,580,793	7,488,676	8,833,994	9,827,763	10,463,131
American Indian, Eskimo, and Aleut		44,021 (Note: Census count excludes "Indians not taxed." Estimates of total Indian population for this decade, including those not taxed, is 339,421)^{[b]}	25,731 (Note: Only including 'Indians taxed.' Estimates of total Indian population for this decade, including those not taxed, is 313,712)^{[b]}	66,407 (Note: Census count excludes "Indians not taxed." Estimates of total Indian population for this decade, including those not taxed, is 306,543)^{[b]}	248,253 (Note: Estimates from the Bureau of Indian Affairs place the Native American population in 1890 slightly higher than the Census Bureau, at 249,278)	237,196 (Note: Estimates from the Bureau of Indian Affairs place the Native American population in 1900 higher than the Census Bureau, at 270,544)	265,683 (Note: Estimates from the Bureau of Indian Affairs place the Native American population in 1910 higher than the Census Bureau, at 304,950)	244,437 (Note: Estimates from the Bureau of Indian Affairs place the Native American population in 1920 higher than the Census Bureau, at 336,337)
Asian and Pacific Islander		34,933	63,254	105,613	109,527	114,189 (Note: Not including 37,656 Native Hawaiians and 86,878 Asians living in the US territory of Hawaii in 1900)	146,863 (Note: Not including 38,547 Native Hawaiians and 108,243 Asians living in the U.S. territory of Hawaii in 1910)	182,137 (Note: Not including 41,750 Native Hawaiians and 158,762 Asians living in the U.S. territory of Hawaii)
Hispanic (of any race)	116,943	155,000		393,555		503,189	797,994	1,286,154
Non-Hispanic White	19,438,451			43,065,679		66,374,317	81,043,248	93,604,612

Racial and Ethnic Demographics of the United States (Total Numbers) Between 1930 and 2020^{[c]} (Note: Population living in Hawaii and Alaska not included until 1960)
Race/Ethnic Group	1930	1940	1950	1960 (Note: First year to include those living in Alaska and Hawaii in the census count)	1970 (Note: 1970 was the first census allowing respondents to select their own race)	1980	1990	2000 (Note: 2000 was the first census allowing respondents to select more than one race)	2010	2020 (Note: Many residents who identified as one race 2010 changed their identification to multiracial in 2020, the percentage figures for White and Black etc. represent those who ticked Alone only.)
Total Population	122,775,046	131,669,275	150,697,361	179,323,175	203,210,158	226,545,805	248,709,873	281,421,906	308,745,538	331,449,281
White	110,286,740	118,214,870	134,942,028	158,831,732	178,119,221	188,371,622	199,686,070	211,460,626	223,553,265	204,277,273
Black	11,891,143	12,865,518	15,042,286	18,871,831	22,539,362	26,495,025	29,986,060	34,658,190	38,929,319	41,104,200
American Indian, Eskimo, and Aleut	332,397 (Note: Estimates from the Bureau of Indian Affairs place the Native American population in 1930 higher than the Census Bureau, at 340,541)	333,969	343,410	551,669	795,110	1,420,400	1,959,234	2,475,956	2,932,248	3,727,135
Asian and Pacific Islander	264,766 (Note: Not including 50,860 Native Hawaiians and 236,323 Asians living in the U.S. territory of Hawaii)	254,918 (Note: Not including 64,310 Native Hawaiians and 246,099 Asians living in the U.S. territory of Hawaii)	321,033 (Note: Not including 86,090 Native Hawaiians and 285,066 Asians living in the U.S. territory of Hawaii)	980,337	1,526,401	3,500,439	7,273,662	10,641,833	15,214,265	20,576,015
Some other race			48,604	87,606	230,064	6,758,319	9,804,847	15,359,073	19,107,368	27,915,715
Two or more races								6,826,228	9,009,073	33,848,943
Hispanic (of any race)		2,021,820	3,231,409	5,814,784	8,920,940	14,608,673	22,354,059	35,305,818	50,477,594	62,080,044
Non-Hispanic White		116,261,189	131,805,405	153,217,498	169,622,593	180,256,366	188,128,296	194,552,774	196,817,552	191,697,647
Non-Hispanic Black					22,084,428	26,401,173	29,216,293	33,947,837	37,685,848	39,940,338
Non-Hispanic Native					768,251	1,325,655	1,793,773	2,068,883	2,247,098	2,251,699
Non-Hispanic Asian or Pacific Islander					1,489,648	3,334,429	6,968,359	10,476,678	14,946,700	20,240,737
Non-Hispanic Other					142,134	916,509	249,093	467,770	604,265	1,689,833
Non-Hispanic Two or more								4,602,146	5,966,481	13,548,983

Racial and Ethnic Demographics of the United States (Percentages) Between 1790 and 1900
Race/Ethnic Group	1790	1800	1810	1820	1830	1840	1850	1860	1870	1880	1890	1900
White	80.7%	81.1%	81.0%	81.6%	81.9%	83.2%	84.3%	85.6%	87.1%	86.5%	87.5%	87.9%
Black	19.3%	18.9%	19.0%	18.4%	18.1%	16.8%	15.7%	14.1%	12.7%	13.1%	11.9%	11.6%
American Indian, Eskimo, and Aleut								0.1%^{[b]}	0.1%^{[b]}	0.1%^{[b]}	0.4%	0.3%
Asian and Pacific Islander								0.1%	0.2%	0.2%	0.2%	0.2%
Hispanic (of any race)							0.5%			0.8%		0.7%
Non-Hispanic White							83.8%			85.9%		87.3%

Racial/Ethnic Demographics of the United States (1910–2020)
Race/Ethnic Group	1910	1920	1930	1940	1950	1960 (Note: First year to include those living in Alaska and Hawaii in the census count)	1970	1980	1990	2000	2010	2020
White	88.9%	89.7%	89.8%	89.8%	89.5%	88.6%	87.5%	83.1%	80.3%	75.1%	72.4%	61.6%
Black	10.7%	9.9%	9.7%	9.8%	10.0%	10.5%	11.1%	11.7%	12.1%	12.3%	12.6%	12.4%
Native	0.3%	0.2%	0.3%	0.3%	0.2%	0.3%	0.4%	0.6%	0.8%	0.9%	0.9%	1.1%
Asian or Pacific Islander	0.2%	0.2%	0.2%	0.2%	0.2%	0.5%	0.8%	1.5%	2.9%	3.8%	4.9%	6.2%
Other race					0.0%	0.0%	0.1%	3.0%	3.9%	5.5%	6.2%	8.4%
Two or more races										2.4%	2.9%	10.2%
Hispanic (of any race)	0.9%	1.2%		1.5%	2.1%	3.2%	4.4%	6.4%	9.0%	12.5%	16.3%	18.7%
Non-Hispanic White	88.1%	88.5%		88.3%	87.5%	85.4%	83.5%	79.6%	75.6%	69.1%	63.7%	57.8%
Non-Hispanic Black							10.9%	11.5%	11.7%	12.1%	12.2%	12.1%
Non-Hispanic Native							0.4%	0.6%	0.7%	0.7%	0.7%	0.7%
Non-Hispanic Asian or Pacific Islander							0.8%	1.5%	2.8%	3.7%	4.8%	6.1%
Non-Hispanic Other							0.1%	0.4%	0.1%	0.2%	0.2%	0.5%
Non-Hispanic Two or more races										1.6%	1.9%	4.1%

a These population estimates include a small number of Native Americans/Indians as part of the Black/Negro population throughout this time period (1610–1780).
b While all Native Americans in the United States were only counted as part of the (total) U.S. population since 1890, the U.S. Census Bureau previously either enumerated or made estimates of the non-taxed Native American population (which was not counted as a part of the U.S. population before 1890) for the 1860–1880 time period. The combined taxed and non-taxed Native American population in the United States was 339,421 in 1860, 313,712 in 1870, and 306,543 in 1880.
c Data on race from the 2000 and 2010 U.S. censuses are not directly comparable with those from the 1990 census and previous censuses due, in large part, to giving respondents the option to report more than one race. This is also true of data from the 2020 census, which saw a large number of respondents who had previously only identified as one race identify as multiracial.

Races Alone or in Combination by percent (2000-2020) (Note: Numbers add up to more than 100% because respondents could select multiple races)
	2000	2010	2020
White	77.1%	74.8%	71.0%
Black	12.9%	13.6%	14.2%
Native American	1.5%	1.7%	2.9%
Asian	4.2%	5.6%	7.2%
Pacific Islander	0.3%	0.4%	0.5%
'Some other race'	6.6%	7.0%	15.1%

Major Asian races or subgroups by population (1850–1980)
	1850	1860	1870	1880	1890	1900	1910	1920	1930	1940	1950	1960	1970	1980	1990
Chinese	4,018	34,933	64,199	105,465	107,488	118,746	94,414	85,202	102,159	106,334	150,005	237,292	436,062	812,178	1,645,472
Filipino								26,634	108,260	98,237	122,698	176,310	343,060	774,652	1,406,770
Indian (Note: Referred to as "Hindu" from 1920-1940)								2,507	3,130	2,405				361,531	815,447
Japanese			55	148	24,326	147,376 (Note: Hawaii became a US territory in 1898. The majority of the Japanese-American population in the US in 1900 resided in Hawaii)	152,745	220,596	278,743	284,852	326,366	464,332	591,290	700,974	847,562
Korean								6,174	8,321	8,562	7,030 (Note: Number referring to Korean population in Hawaii only as Korean was not included as a separate category in the main 1950 Census)		69,130	354,593	798,849
Vietnamese														261,729	614,547

Major Asian subgroups alone or in combination by Population (2000-2020)
	2000	2010	2020
Chinese	2,432,585	3,794,673	5,205,461
Filipino	2,364,815	3,416,840	4,436,992
Indian	1,899,599	3,183,063	4,768,846
Japanese	1,469,637	1,304,286	1,586,652
Korean	1,228,427	1,706,822	1,989,519
Vietnamese	1,223,736	1,737,433	2,293,392

== Population by race and age (Census 2010 and Census 2020) ==
=== Census 2010 ===
USA (100%)	Not Hispanic or Latino	Hispanic or Latino	White alone	White alone, not Hispanic or Latino	White alone, Hispanic or Latino	Black or African American alone	Black or African American alone, not Hispanic or Latino	Black or African American alone, Hispanic or Latino	American Indian and Alaska Native alone	American Indian and Alaska Native alone, not Hispanic or Latino	American Indian and Alaska Native alone, Hispanic or Latino	Asian alone	Asian alone, not Hispanic or Latino	Asian alone, Hispanic or Latino	Native Hawaiian and Other Pacific Islander alone	Native Hawaiian and Other Pacific Islander alone, not Hispanic or Latino	Native Hawaiian and Other Pacific Islander alone, Hispanic or Latino	Some other race alone	Some other race alone, not Hispanic or Latino	Some other race alone, Hispanic or Latino	Two or more races	Two or more races, not Hispanic or Latino	Two or more races, Hispanic or Latino
308,745,538	258,267,944 (83.65%)	50,477,594 (16.35%)	223,553,265 (72.41%)	196,818,552 (63.75%)	26,735,713 (8.66%)	38,929,319 (12.61%)	37,685,848 (12.21%)	1,243,471 (0.40%)	2,932,248 (0.95%)	2,247,098 (0.73%)	685,150 (0.22%)	14,674,252 (4.75%)	14,465,124 (4.69%)	209,128 (0.07%)	540,013 (0.17%)	481,576 (0.16%)	58,437 (0.02%)	19,107,368 (6.19%)	604,265 (0.20%)	18,503,103 (5.99%)	9,009,073 (2.92%)	5,966,481 (1.93%)	3,042,592 (0.99%)

Age group	USA 100% (percent of the population)	(percent in the race/percent in the age group)									
Age group	USA 100% (percent of the population)	Not Hispanic or Latino	Hispanic or Latino	White alone	White alone, not Hispanic or Latino	Black or African American alone	American Indian and Alaska Native alone	Asian alone	Native Hawaiian and Other Pacific Islander alone	Some Other Race Alone	Mixed (Two or More Races)
Population	308 745 538	258 267 944; 83.65%	50 477 594; 16.35%	223 553 265; 72.41%	196 817 552; 63.75%	38 929 319; 12.61%	2 932 248; 0.95%	14 674 252; 4.75%	540 013; 0.17%	19 107 368; 6.19%	9 009 073; 2.92%
0–4	20,201,362 (6.54%)	15,086,874 (5.84%/74/68%)	5,114,488 (10.13%/25.32%)	12,795,675 (5.72%/63.34%)	10,254,079 (5.21%/50.76%)	2,902,590 (7.46%/14.37%)	244,615 (8.34%/1.21%)	898,011 (6.12%/4.45%)	44,991 (8.33%/0.22%)	1,917,696 (10.04%/9.49%)	1,397,784 (15.52%/6.92%)
5–9	20,348,657 (6.59%)	15,557,886 (6.02%/76.46%)	4,790,771 (9.49%/23.54%)	13,293,799 (5.95%/65.33%)	10,838,062 (5.51%/53.26%)	2,882,597 (7.40%/14.17%)	243,259 (8.30%/1.20%)	928,248 (6.33%/4.56%)	43,267 (8.01%/0.21%)	1,784,074 (9.34%/8.77%)	1,173,413 (13.02%/5.77%)
10–14	20,677,194 (6.70%)	16,151,952 (6.25%/78.11%)	4,525,242 (8.96%/21.89%)	13,737,332 (6.14%/66.44%)	11,403,383 (5.79%/55.15%)	3,034,266 (7.79%/14.67%)	245,049 (8.36%/1.19%)	881,590 (6.01%/4.26%)	42,387 (7.85%/0.20%)	1,701,946 (8.91%/8.23%)	1,034,624 (11.48%/5.00%)
15–19	22,040,343 (7.14%)	17,508,188 (6.78%/79.44%)	4,532,155 (8.98%/20.56%)	14,620,638 (6.54%/66.35%)	12,341,592 (6.27%/56.00%)	3,448,051 (8.86%/15.64%)	263,805 (9.00%/1.20%)	956,028 (6.52%/4.34%)	47,250 (8.75%/0.21%)	1,791,783 (9.38%/8.13%)	912,788 (10.13%/4.14%)
20–24	21,585,999 (6.99%)	17,263,724 (6.68%/79.98%)	4,322,275 (8.56%/20.02%)	14,535,947 (6.50%/67.34%)	12,426,842 (6.31%/57.57%)	3,111,397 (7.99%/14.41%)	240,716 (8.21%/1.12%)	1,106,222 (7.54%/5.12%)	52,750 (9.77%/0.24%)	1,818,734 (9.52%/8.43%)	720,233 (7.99%/3.34%)
25–29	21,101,849 (6.83%)	16,791,378 (6.50%/79.57%)	4,310,471 (8.54%/20.43%)	14,345,364 (6.42%/67.98%)	12,226,930 (6.21%/57.94%)	2,786,254 (7.16%/13.20%)	221,654 (7.56%/1.05%)	1,234,322 (8.41%/5.85%)	49,912 (9.24%/0.24%)	1,835,212 (9.60%/8.70%)	629,131 (6.98%/2.98%)
30–34	19,962,099 (6.47%)	15,837,616 (6.13%/79.34%)	4,124,483 (8.17%/20.66%)	13,573,270 (6.07%/68.00%)	11,495,910 (5.84%/57.59%)	2,627,925 (6.75%/13.16%)	202,928 (6.92%/1.02%)	1,240,906 (8.46%/6.22%)	43,748 (8.10%/0.22%)	1,720,443 (9.00%/8.62%)	552,879 (6.14%/2.77%)
35–39	20,179,642 (6.54%)	16,323,302 (6.32%/80.89%)	3,856,340 (7.64%/19.11%)	13,996,797 (6.26%/69.36%)	11,984,317 (6.09%/59.39%)	2,613,389 (6.71%/12.95%)	196,017 (6.68%/0.97%)	1,296,301 (8.83%/6.42%)	38,730 (7.17%/0.19%)	1,549,506 (8.11%/7.68%)	488,902 (5.43%/2.42%)
40–44	20,890,964 (6.77%)	17,448,564 (6.76%/83.52%)	3,442,400 (6.82%/16.48%)	15,052,798 (6.73%/72.05%)	13,218,304 (6.72%/63.27%)	2,669,034 (6.86%/12.78%)	194,713 (6.64%/0.93%)	1,155,565 (7.87%/5.53%)	36,391 (6.74%/0.17%)	1,345,601 (7.04%/6.44%)	436,862 (4.85%/2.09%)
45–49	22,708 591 (7.36%)	19,686,517 (7.62%/86.69%)	3,022,074 (5.99%/13.31%)	17,028,255 (7.62%/74.99%)	15,355,524 (7.80%/67.62%)	2,828,657 (7.27%/12.46%)	207,857 (7.09%/0.92%)	1,076,060 (7.33%/4.74%)	35,645 (6.60%/0.16%)	1,117,950 (5.85%/4.92%)	414,167 (4.60%/1.82%)
50–54	22,298,125 (7.22%)	19,856,671 (7.69%/89.05%)	2,441,454 (4.84%/10.95%)	17,178,632 (7.68%/77.04%)	15,785,646 (8.02%/70.79%)	2,694,247 (6.92%/12.08%)	191,893 (6.54%/0.86%)	980,282 (6.68%/4.40%)	30,896 (5.72%/0.14%)	861,811 (4.51%/3.86%)	360,364 (4.00%/1.62%)
55–59	19,664,805 (6.37%)	17,823,373 (6.90%/90.64%)	1,841,432 (3.65%/9.36%)	15,562,187 (6.96%/79.14%)	14,454,799 (7.34%/73.51%)	2,205,820 (5.67%/11.22%)	154,320 (5.26%/0.78%)	844,490 (5.75%/4.29%)	24,045 (4.45%/0.12%)	594,671 (3.11%/3.02%)	279,272 (3.10%/1.42%)
60–64	16,817,924 (5.45%)	15,445,539 (5.98%/91.84%)	1,372,385 (2.72%/8.16%)	13,693,334 (6.13%/81.42%)	12,822,733 (6.52%/76.24%)	1,686,695 (4.33%/10.03%)	118,362 (4.04%/0.70%)	689,601 (4.70%/4.10%)	18,788 (3.48%/0.11%)	401,947 (2.10%/2.39%)	209,197 (2.32%/1.24%)
65–69	12,435,263 (4.03%)	11,486,687 (4.45%/92.37%)	948,576 (1.88%/7.63%)	10,313,002 (4.61%/82.93%)	9,682,945 (4.92%/77.87%)	1,162,577 (2.99%/9.35%)	79,079 (2.70%/0.64%)	474,327 (3.23%/3.81%)	12,070 (2.24%/0.10%)	252,195 (1.32%/2.03%)	142,013 (1.58%/1.14%)
70–74	9,278,166 (3.01%)	8,578,024 (3.32%/92.45%)	700,142 (1.39%/7.55%)	7,740,932 (3.46%/83.43%)	7,257,878 (3.69%/78.23%)	852,317 (2.19%/9.19%)	53,926 (1.84%/0.58%)	354,268 (2.41%/3.82%)	8,149 (1.51%/0.09%)	169,574 (0.89%/1.83%)	99,000 (1.10%/1.07%)
75–79	7,317,795 (2.37%)	6,806,987 (2.64%/93.02%)	510,808 (1.01%/6.98%)	6,224,569 (2.78%/85.06%)	5,861,366 (2.98%/80.10%)	616,789 (1.58%/8.43%)	35,268 (1.20%/0.48%)	251,210 (1.71%/3.43%)	5,363 (0.99%/0.07%)	114,114 (0.60%/1.56%)	70,482 (0.78%/0.96%)
80–84	5,743,327 (1.86%)	5,391,839 (2.09%/93.88%)	351,488 (0.70%/6.12%)	5,002,427 (2.24%/87.10%)	4,746,881 (2.41%/82.65%)	424,592 (1.09%/7.39%)	21,963 (0.75%/0.38%)	168,879 (1.15%/2.94%)	3,217 (0.60%/0.06%)	74,076 (0.39%/1.29%)	48,173 (0.53%/0.84%)
85-89	3,620,459 (1.17%)	3,435,031 (1.33%/94.88%)	185,428 (0.37%/5.12%)	3,203,863 (1.43%/88.49%)	3,068,224 (1.56%/84.75%)	244,879 (0.63%/6.76%)	11,362 (0.39%/0.31%)	93,136 (0.63%/2.57%)	1,623 (0.30%/0.04%)	38,644 (0.20%/1.07%)	26,952 (0.30%/0.74%)
90-94	1,448,366 (0.47%)	1,383,837 (0.54%/95.54%)	64,529 (0.13%/4.46%)	1,286,351 (0.58%/88.81%)	1,238,874 (0.63%/85.54%)	99,949 (0.26%/6.90%)	4,082 (0.14%/0.28%)	34,632 (0.24%/2.39%)	566 (0.10%/0.04%)	13,058 (0.07%/0.90%)	9,728 (0.11%/0.67%)
95-99	371,244 (0.12%)	353,680 (0.14%/95.27%)	17,564 (0.03%/4.73%)	324,094 (0.14%/87.30%)	311,350 (0.16%/83.87%)	30,778 (0.08%/8.29%)	1,125 (0.04%/0.30%)	8,850 (0.06%/2.38%)	181 (0.03%/0.05%)	3,655 (0.02%/0.98%)	2,561 (0.03%/0.69%)
100+	53,364 (0.02%)	50,275 (0.02%/94.21%)	3,089 (0.01%/5.79%)	43,999 (0.02%/82.45%)	41,913 (0.02%/78.54%)	6,516 (0.02%/12.21%)	255 (0.01%/0.48%)	1,324 (0.01%/2.48%)	44 (0.01%/0.08%)	678 (<0.01%/1.27%)	548 (0.01%/1.03%)
0-14	61,227,213 (19.83%)	46,796,712 (18.12%/76.43%)	14,430,501 (28.59%/23.57%)	39,826,806 (17.82%/65.05%)	32,495,524 (16.51%/53.07%)	8,819,453 (22.66%/14.40%)	732,923 (25.00%/1.20%)	2,707,849 (18.45%/4.42%)	130,645 (24.19%/0.21%)	5,403,716 (28.28%/8.83%)	3,605,821 (40.02%/5.89%)
15-64	207,250,341 (67.13%)	173,984,872 (67.37%/83.95%)	33,265,469 (65.90%/16.05%)	149,587,222 (66.91%/72.18%)	132,112,597 (67.12%/63.75%)	26,671,469 (68.51%/12.87%)	1,992,265 (67.94%/0.96%)	10,579,777 (72.10%/5.10%)	378,155 (70.03%/0.18%)	13,037,658 (68.23%/6.29%)	5,003,795 (55.54%/2.41%)
65+	40,267,984 (13.04%)	37,486,360 (14.51%/93.09%)	2,781,624 (5.51%/6.91%)	34,139,237 (15.27%/84.78%)	32,209,431 (16.37%/79.99%)	3,438,397 (8.83%/8.54%)	207,060 (7.06%/0.51%)	1,386,626 (9.45%/3.44%)	31,213 (5.78%0.08%))	665,994 (3.49%/1.65%)	399,457 (4.43%/0.99%)

=== Census 2020 ===
USA 100% (percent of the population)	Not Hispanic or Latino	Hispanic or Latino	White alone	White alone, not Hispanic or Latino	White alone, Hispanic or Latino	Black or African American alone	Black or African American alone, not Hispanic or Latino	Black or African American alone, Hispanic or Latino	American Indian and Alaska Native alone	American Indian and Alaska Native alone, not Hispanic or Latino	American Indian and Alaska Native alone, Hispanic or Latino	Asian alone	Asian alone, not Hispanic or Latino	Asian alone, Hispanic or Latino	Native Hawaiian and Other Pacific Islander alone	Native Hawaiian and Other Pacific Islander alone, not Hispanic or Latino	Native Hawaiian and Other Pacific Islander alone, Hispanic or Latino	Some other race alone	Some other race alone, not Hispanic or Latino	Some other race alone, Hispanic or Latino	Two or more races	Two or more races, not Hispanic or Latino	Two or more races, Hispanic or Latino
331,449,281	269,369,237 (81.27%)	62,080,044 (18.73%)	204,277,273 (61.63%)	191,697,647 (57.84%)	12,579,626 (3.80%)	41,104,200 (12.40%)	39,940,338 (12.05%)	1,163,862 (0.35%)	3,727,135 (1.12%)	2,251,699 (0.68%)	1,475,436 (0.45%)	19,886,049 (6.00%)	19,618,719 (5.92%)	267,330 (0.08%)	689,966 (0.21%)	622,018 (0.19%)	67,948 (0.02%)	27,915,715 (8.42%)	1,689,833 (0.51%)	26,225,882 (7.91%)	33,848,943 (10.21%)	13,548,983 (4.09%)	20,299,960 (6.12%)

By age group: Numbers (percent in the race/percent in the age group)
Age group	USA 100% (percent of the population)	Not Hispanic or Latino	Hispanic or Latino	White alone	White alone, not Hispanic or Latino	Black or African American alone	American Indian and Alaska Native alone	Asian alone	Native Hawaiian and Other Pacific Islander alone	Some Other Race Alone	Mixed (Two or More Races)
Total	331,449,281	269,369,237; 81.27%	62,080,044; 18.73%	204,277,273; 61.63%	191,697,647; 57.84%	41,104,200; 12.40%	3,727,135; 1.12%	19,886,049; 6.00%	689,966; 0.21%	27,915,715; 8.42%	33,848,943; 10.21%
0–4	18,400,235 (5.55%)	13,764,537 (5.11%/74.81%)	4,635,698 (7.47%/25.19%)	9,686,569 (4.74%/52.64%)	8,641,422 (4.51%/46.96%)	2,576,372 (6.27%/14.00%)	237,635 (6.38%/1.29%)	1,015,153 (5.10%/5.52%)	52,195 (7.56%/0.28%)	1,938,789 (6.95%/10.54%)	2,893,522 (8.55%/15.73%)
5–9	20,130,423 (6.07%)	14,994,890 (5.57%/74.49%)	5,135,533 (9.27%/25.51%)	10,593,278 (5.19%/52.62%)	9,483,892 (4.95%/47.11%)	2,804,298 (6.82%/13.93%)	274,115 (7.35%/1.36%)	1,133,658 (5.70%/5.63%)	55,779 (8.08%/0.28%)	2,236,415 (8.01%/11.11%)	3,032,880 (8.96%/15.07%)
10–14	21,627,830 (6.53%)	15,952,544 (5.92%/73.76%)	5,675,286 (9.14%/26.24%)	11,452,928 (5.61%/52.95%)	10,177,287 (5.31%/47.06%)	3,019,199 (7.35%/13.96%)	310,224 (8.32%/1.43%)	1,152,734 (5.80%/5.33%)	54,764 (7.94%/0.25%)	2,402,304 (8.61%/11.11%)	3,235,677 (9.56%/14.96%)
15–19	22,036,076 (6.65%)	16,510,072 (6.13%/74.92%)	5,526,004 (8.90%/25.08%)	11,982,152 (5.87%/54.38%)	10,765,694 (5.62%/48.85%)	3,050,376 (7.42%/13.84%)	309,596 (8.31%/1.40%)	1,242,406 (6.25%/5.60%)	56,215 (8.15%/0.26%)	2,398,762 (8.59%/10.89%)	2,996,569 (8.85%/13.60%)
20–24	22,166,199 (6.69%)	17,008,223 (6.21%/76.73%	5,157,976 (8.21%/23.27%)	12,437,316 (6.09%/56.11%)	11,283,786 (5.89%/50.91%)	3,023,526 (7.36%/13.64%)	278,193 (7.46%/1.26%)	1,460,719 (7.35%/6.59%)	60,112 (8.71%/0.27%)	2,324,083 (8.33%/10.48%)	2,582,250 (7.63%/11.65%)
25–29	22,301,254 (6.73%)	17,349,730 (6.44%/77.80%)	4,951,524 (7.98%/22.20%)	12,616,069 (6.18%/56.57%)	11,546,876 (6.02%/51.78%)	3,061,013 (7.45%/13.73%)	279,595 (7.50%/1.25%)	1,582,493 (7.96%/7.10%)	59,286 (8.59%/0.27%)	2,297,655 (8.23%/10.30%)	2,405,143 (7.11%/10.78%)
30–34	22,533,412 (6.80%)	17,844,727 (6.62%/79.19%)	4,688,685 (7.55%/20.81%)	13,026,207 (6.38%/57.81%))	12,075,227 (6.30%/53.59%)	2,969,687 (7.22%/13.18%)	278,721 (7.48%/1.24%)	1,672,867 (8.41%/7.42%)	56,576 (8.20%/0.25%)	2,235,382 (8.01%/9.92%)	2,293,972 (6.78%/10.18%)
35–39	21,874,944 (6.60%)	17,369,972 (6.45%/79.41%)	4,504,972 (7.26%/20.59%)	12,743,485 (6.24%/58.26%)	11,902,069 (6.21%/54.41%)	2,765,895 (6.73%/12.64%)	270,905 (7.27%/1.24%)	1,629,404 (8.19%/7.45%)	51,671 (7.49%/0.24%)	2,202,751 (7.89%/10.07%)	2,210,833 (6.53%/10.11%)
40–44	20,309,193 (6.13%)	16,099,345 (5.98%/79.27%)	4,209,848 (6.78%/20.73%)	11,808,166 (5.78%/58.14%)	11,076,509 (5.78%/54.54%)	2,577,747 (6.27%/12.69%)	252,676 (6.78%/1.24%)	1,476,878 (7.43%/7.27%)	45,233 (6.56%/0.22%)	2,073,568 (7.43%/10.21%)	2,074,925 (6.13%/10.22%)
45–49	20,145,294 (6.08%)	16,304,070 (6.05%/80.93%)	3,841,224 (6.19%/19.07%)	12,069,163 (5.91%/59.91%)	11,424,988 (5.96%/56.71%)	2,509,695 (6.11%/12.46%)	236,609 (6.35%/1.17%)	1,467,397 (7.38%/7.28%)	39,597 (5.74%/0.20%)	1,842,345 (6.60%/9.15%)	1,980,488 (5.85%/9.83%)
50–54	20,723,512 (6.25%)	17,273,565 (6.41%/83.35%)	3,449,947 (5.56%/16.65%)	13,134,513 (6.43%/63.38%)	12,557,076 (6.55%/60.59%)	2,549,708 (6.20%/12.30%)	223,614 (6.00%/1.08%)	1,298,154 (6.53%/6.26%)	37,422 (5.42%/0.18%)	1,632,564 (5.85%/7.88%)	1,847,537 (5.46%/8.92%)
55–59	22,120,489 (6.67%)	19,133,893 (7.10%/86.50%)	2,986,596 (4.81%/13.50%)	14,956,116 (7.32%/67.61%)	14,435,865 (7.53%/65.26%)	2,636,046 (6.41%/11.92%)	219,800 (5.90%/0.99%)	1,172,120 (5.89%/5.30%)	34,986 (5.07%/0.16%)	1,353,154 (4.85%/6.12%)	1,748,267 (5.16%/7.90%)
60–64	21,287,919 (6.42%)	18,899,805 (7.02%/88.78%)	2,388,114 (3.85%/11.22%)	15,048,564 (7.37%/70.69%)	14,621,335 (7.63%/68.68%)	2,438,691 (5.93%/11.46%)	190,119 (5.10%/0.89%)	1,052,529 (5.29%/4.94%)	29,426 (4.26%/0.14%)	1,059,079 (3.79%/4.98%)	1,469,511 (4.34%/6.90%)
65–69	18,288,727 (5.52%)	16,510,781 (6.13%/90.28%)	1,777,946 (2.86%/9.72%)	13,457,380 (6.59%/73.58%)	13,122,655 (6.85%/71.75%)	1,918,885 (4.67%/10.49%)	142,308 (3.82%/0.78%)	881,250 (4.43%/4.82%)	22,043 (3.19%/0.12%)	747,665 (2.68%/4.09%)	1,119,196 (3.31%/6.12%)
70–74	14,823,238 (4.47%)	13,545,200 (5.03%/91.38%)	1,278,038 (2.06%/8.62%)	11,345,864 (5.55%/76.54%)	11,086,087 (5.78%/74.79%)	1,364,658 (3.32%/9.21%)	99,720 (2.68%/0.67%)	679,635 (3.42%/4.58%)	15,378 (2.23%/0.10%)	502,935 (1.80%/3.39%)	815,048 (2.41%/5.50%)
75–79	9,955,322 (3.00%)	9,131,173 (3.39%/91.72%)	824,149 (1.33%/8.28%)	7,800,884 (3.82%/78.36%)	7,620,790 (3.98%/76.55%)	837,504 (2.04%/8.41%)	59,602 (1.60%/0.60%)	427,865 (2.15%/4.30%)	9,181 (1.33%/0.09%)	304,586 (1.09%/3.06%)	516,000 (1.52%/5.18%)
80–84	6,388,779 (1.93%)	5,849,073 (2.17%/91.55%)	539,706 (0.87%/8.45%	5,027,743 (2.46%/78.70%)	4,903,950 (2.56%/76.76%)	522,055 (1.27%/8.17%)	35,313 (0.95%/0.55%)	281,676 (1.42%/4.41%)	5,175 (0.75%/0.08%)	190,529 (0.68%/2.98%)	326,288 (0.96%/5.11%)
85-89	3,829,179 (1.16%)	3,515,522 (1.31%/91.81%)	313,657 (0.51%/8.19%)	3,063,946 (1.50%/80.02%)	2,990,038 (1.56%/78.09%)	292,426 (0.71%/7.64%)	18,383 (0.49%/0.48%)	158,781 (0.80%/4.15%)	2,933 (0.43%/0.08%)	106,620 (0.38%/2.78%)	186,090 (0.55%/4.86%)
90-94	1,876,291 (0.57%)	1,730,890 (0.64%/92.25%)	145,401 (0.23%/7.75%)	1,525,362 (0.75%/81.30%)	1,491,082 (0.78%/79.47%)	134,450 (0.33%/7.17%)	7,528 (0.20%/0.40%)	73,783 (0.37%/3.93%)	1,333 (0.19%/0.07%)	48,881 (0.18%/2.61%)	84,954 (0.25%/4.53%)
95-99	550,826 (0.17%)	508,390 (0.19%/92.30%)	42,436 (0.07%/7.70%)	442,084 (0.22%/80.26%)	432,635 (0.23%/78.54%)	43,739 (0.11%/7.94%)	2,104 (0.06%/0.38%)	22,835 (0.11%/4.15%)	511 (0.07%/0.09%)	15,132 (0.05%/2.75%)	24,421 (0.07%/4.43%)
100+	80,139 (0.02%)	72,835 (0.03%/90.89%)	7,304 (0.01%/9.11%)	59,784 (0.03%/74.60%)	58,384 (0.03%/72.85%)	8,230 (0.02%/10.27%)	375 (0.01%/0.47%)	3,712 (0.02%/4.63%)	150 (0.02%/0.19%)	2,516 (0.01%/3.14%)	5,372 (0.02%/6.70%)
0-14	60,158,488 (18.15%)	44,711,971 (16.60%/74.32%)	15,446,517 (24.88%/25.68%)	31,732,775 (15.53%/52.75%)	28,302,601 (14.76%/47.05%)	8,399,869 (20.44%/13.96%)	821,974 (22.05%/1.37%)	3,301,545 (16.60%/5.49%)	162,738 (23.59%/0.27%)	6,577,508 (23.56%/10.93%)	9,162,079 (27.07%/15.23%)
15-64	215,498,292 (65.02%)	17,379,402 (64.52%/80.65%)	41,704,890 (67.18%/19.35%)	129,821,751 (63.55%/60.24%)	121,689,425 (63.48%/56.47%)	27,582,384 (67.10%/12.80%)	2,539,828 (68.14%/1.18%)	14,054,967 (70.68%/6.52%)	470,524 (68.20%/0.22%)	19,419,343 (69.56%/9.01%)	21,609,495 (63.84%/10.03%)
65+	55,792,501 (16.83%)	50,863,864 (18.88%/91.16%)	4,928,637 (7.94%/8.83%)	42,722,747 (20.91%/76.57%)	41,705,621 (21.76%/74.75%)	5,121,947 (12.46%/9.18%)	365,333 (9.80%/0.65%)	2,529,537 (12.72%/4.53%)	56,704 (8.22%/0.10%)	1,918,864 (6.87%/3.44%)	3,077,369 (9.09%/5.52%)

== Population by race (estimates) ==
Year	USA	White alone	White alone (Non-Hispanic)	Black alone	Black alone (Non-Hispanic)	Asian alone	American Indian and Alaska Native alone	Native Hawaiian and Other Pacific Islander alone	Some other race	Two or more races	White and Black	White and Asian	White and American Indian and Alaska Native	Black and American Indian and Alaska Native	Two or more races (Other)
2010	309,349,689	229,397,472 (74.15%)	196,929,412 (63.66%)	38,874,625 (12.57%)	37,897,524 (12.25%)	14,728,302 (4.76%)	2,553,566 (0.83%)	507,916 (0.16%)	14,889,440 (4.81%)	8,398,368 (2.71%)	2,028,521 (0.66%)	1,558,860 (0.50%)	1,705,454 (0.55%)	289,341 (0.09%)	2,816,192 (0.91%)
2011	311,591,919	230,838,975 (74.08%)	197,084,523 (63.25%)	39,189,528 (12.58%)	38,148,876 (12.24%)	15,020,419 (4.82%)	2,547,006 (0.82%)	506,017 (0.16%)	14,768,156 (4.74%)	8,721,818 (2.80%)	2,174,782 (0.70%)	1,652,866 (0.53%)	1,734,245 (0.56%)	302,250 (0.10%)	2,857,675 (0.92%)
2012	313,914,040	231,992,377 (73.90%)	197,243,423 (62.83%)	39,623,138 (12.62%)	38,464,192 (12.25%)	15,555,530 (4.96%)	2,563,505 (0.82%)	543,198 (0.17%)	14,562,678 (4.64%)	9,073,614 (2.89%)	2,275,588 (0.72%)	1,733,309 (0.55%)	1,799,343 (0.57%)	316,788 (0.10%)	2,948,586 (0.94%)
2013	316,128,839	232,969,901 (73.70%)	197,392,411 (62.44%)	39,919,371 (12.63%)	38,807,755 (12.28%)	16,012,120 (5.07%)	2,521,131 (0.80%)	525,750 (0.17%)	14,811,025 (4.69%)	9,369,541 (2.96%)	2,408,065 (0.76%)	1,840,160 (0.58%)	1,832,055 (0.58%)	318,286 (0.10%)	2,970,975 (0.94%)
2014	318,857,056	233,963,128 (73.38%)	197,409,353 (61.91%)	40,379,066 (12.66%)	39,267,149 (12.31%)	16,686,960 (5.23%)	2,601,714 (0.82%)	557,154 (0.17%)	15,063,263 (4.72%)	9,605,771 (3.01%)	2,518,746 (0.79%)	1,929,461 (0.61%)	1,881,024 (0.59%)	312,454 (0.10%)	2,964,086 (0.93%)
2015	321,418,821	234,940,100 (73.09%)	197,534,496 (61.46%)	40,695,277 (12.66%)	39,597,600 (12.32%)	17,273,777 (5.37%)	2,597,249 (0.81%)	554,946 (0.17%)	15,375,942 (4.78%)	9,981,530 (3.11%)	2,654,878 (0.83%)	2,038,169 (0.63%)	1,911,158 (0.59%)	305,975 (0.10%)	3,071,350 (0.96%)
2016	323,127,515	234,644,039 (72.62%)	197,479,450 (61.12%)	40,893,369 (12.66%)	39,717,127 (12.29%)	17,556,935 (5.43%)	2,676,399 (0.83%)	595,986 (0.18%)	16,334,352 (5.06%)	10,426,435 (3.23%)	2,818,186 (0.87%)	2,168,592 (0.67%)	1,926,535 (0.60%)	333,113 (0.10%)	3,180,009 (0.98%)
2017	325,719,178	235,507,457 (72.30%)	197,285,202 (60.57%)	41,393,491 (12.71%)	40,129,593 (12.32%)	18,215,328 (5.59%)	2,726,278 (0.84%)	608,219 (0.19%)	16,552,940 (5.08%)	10,715,465 (3.29%)	2,965,541 (0.91%)	2,230,662 (0.68%)	1,908,749 (0.59%)	316,918 (0.10%)	3,293,595 (1.01%)
2018	327,167,439	236,173,020 (72.19%)	197,033,939 (60.22%)	41,617,764 (12.72%)	40,305,870 (12.32%)	18,415,198 (5.63%)	2,801,587 (0.86%)	626,054 (0.19%)	16,253,785 (4.97%)	11,280,031 (3.45%)	3,179,968 (0.97%)	2,454,776 (0.75%)	1,886,971 (0.58%)	311,267 (0.10%)	3,447,049 (1.05%)
2019	328,239,523	236,475,401 (72.04%)	196,789,401 (59.95%)	41,989,671 (12.79%)	40,596,040 (12.37%)	18,636,984 (5.68%)	2,847,336 (0.87%)	628,683 (0.19%)	16,352,553 (4.98%)	11,308,895 (3.45%)	3,276,186 (1.00%)	2,502,591 (0.76%)	1,845,910 (0.56%)	298,099 (0.09%)	3,386,109 (1.03%)

Black population (2000 and 2010)
Black group	2000	2010
Black alone (% in USA)	34,658,190 (12.32%)	38,929,319 (12.61%)
Black in combination with other races (% in USA/% in group)	1,761,244 (0.63%/4.84%)	3,091,424 (1.00%/7.36%)
Black alone or in combination with other races (% in USA)	36,419,434 (12.94%)	42,020,743 (13.61%)
Black alone (Not Hispanic) (% of Blacks)	33,947,837 (97.95%)	37,685,848 (96.81%)
Black in combination with other races (Not Hispanic) (% in this group/% in their group)	1,435,914 (81.53%/4.06%)	2,437,677 (78.85%/6.08%)
Black alone or in combination with other races (Not Hispanic) (% in USA)	35,383,751 (12.57%)	40,123,525 (13.00%)
Black alone (Hispanic) (% of Blacks)	710,353 (2.05%)	1,243,471 (3.19%)
Black in combination with other races (Hispanic) (% in this group/% in their group)	325,330 (18.47%/31.41%)	653,747 (21.15%/34.46%)
Black alone or in combination with other races (Hispanic) (% in USA)	1,035,683 (0.37%)	1,897,218 (0.61%)

=== Hispanic or Latino (Estimates) ===
Hispanic population (2000 and 2010) (% in USA/% in Hispanic group)
Hispanic group	2000	2010
Total	35,305,818 (12.55%/100%)	50,477,594 (16.35/100%)
Mexican	20,640,711 (7.33%/58.46%)	31,798,258 (10.30%/62.99%)
Puerto Rican	3,406,178 (1.21%/9.65%)	4,623,716 (1.50%/9.16%)
Cuban	1,241,685 (0.44%/3.52%)	1,785,547 (0.58%/3.54%)
Dominican	764,945 (0.27%/2.17%)	1,414,703 (0.46%/2.80%)
Costa Rican	68,588 (0.02%/0.19%)	126,418 (0.04%/0.25%)
Guatemalan	372,487 (0.14%/1.06%)	1,044,209 (0.34%/2.07%)
Honduran	217,569 (0.08%/0.62%)	633,401 (0.21%/1.25%)
Nicaraguan	177,684 (0.06%/0.50%)	348,202 (0.11%/0.69%)
Panamanian	91,723 (0.03%/0.26%)	165,456 (0.05%/0.33%)
Salvadoran	655,165 (0.23%/1.86%)	1,648,968 (0.53%/3.27%)
Other Central American	103,721 (0.04%/0.29%)	31,626 (0.01%/0.06%)
Argentine	100,864 (0.04%/0.29%)	224,952 (0.07%/0.45%)
Bolivian	42,068 (0.01%/0.12%)	99,210 (0.03%/0.20%)
Chilean	68,849 (0.02%/0.20%)	126,810 (0.04%/0.25%)
Colombian	470,684 (0.17%/1.33%)	908,734 (0.29%/1.80%)
Ecuadorian	260,559 (0.09%/0.74%)	564,631 (0.18%/1.12%)
Paraguayan	8,769 (<0.01%/0.02%)	20,023 (0.01%/0.04%)
Peruvian	233,926 (0.08%/0.66%)	531,358 (0.17%/1.05%)
Uruguayan	18,804 (0.01%/0.05%)	56,884 (0.02%/0.11%)
Venezuelan	91,507 (0.03%/0.26%)	215,023 (0.07%/0.43%)
Other South American	57,532 (0.02%/0.16%)	21,809 (0.01%/0.04%)
Spaniard	100,135 (0.04%/0.28%)	635,253 (0.21%/1.26%)
All other Hispanic or Latino	6,111,665 (2.17%/17.31%)	3,452,403 (1.12%/6.84%)

Hispanic or Latino Population by Type of Origin and Race: 2010
Origin	Total Hispanic population (% in Hispanic Group/% in USA)	White (% in group)	Black (% in group)	American Indian and Alaska Native (% in group)	Asian (% in group)	Native Hawaiian and Other Pacific Islander (% in group)	Some Other Race (% in group)	Two or More Races (% in group)
Total Hispanic	50,477,594 (100%/16.35%)	26,735,713 (52.97%)	1,243,471 (2.46%)	685,150 (1.36%)	209,128 (0.41%)	58,437 (0.12%)	18,503,103 (36.66%)	3,042,592 (6.03%)
Central American	35,976,538 (71.27%/11.65%)	18,491,777 (51.40%)	425,389 (1.18%)	523,432 (1.45%)	113,846 (0.32%)	34,096 (0.10%)	14,332,437 (39.84%)	1,875,561 (5.21%)
Mexican	31,798,258 (62.99%/10.30%)	16,794,111 (52.81%)	296,778 (0.93%)	460,098 (1.45%)	101,654 (0.32%)	24,600 (0.08%)	12,544,645 (39.45%)	1,576,372 (4.96%)
Guatemalan	1,044,209 (2.07%/0.34%)	401,763 (38.48%)	11,471 (1.10%)	31,197 (2.99%)	2,386 (0.23%)	7,251 (0.69%)	515,394 (49.36%)	74,747 (7.16%)
Salvadoran	1,648,968 (3.27%/0.53%)	663,224 (50.22%)	16,150 (0.98%)	17,682 (1.07%)	4,737 (0.29%)	1,105 (0.07%)	832,805 (50.50%)	113,265 (6.87%)
Other Central American	1,305,103 (2.59%/0.42%)	632,679 (48.48%)	100,990 (7.74%)	14,455 (1.11%)	5,069 (0.39%)	1,140 (0.09%)	439,593 (33.68%)	111,177 (8.52%)
South American	2,769,434 (5.49%/0.90%)	1,825,468 (65.91%)	37,786 (1.36%)	21,053 (0.76%)	12,224 (0.44%)	1,079 (0.04%)	690,073 (24,92%)	181,751 (6.56%)
Caribbean	7,823,966 (15.50%/2.53%)	4,400,071 (56.24%)	667,775 (8.53%)	64,689 (0.83%)	32,759 (0.42%)	12,814 (0.16%)	2,039,263 (26.06%)	606,595 (7.75%)
Cuban	1,785,547 (3.54%/0.58%)	1,525,521 (85.44%)	82,398 (4.61%)	3,002 (0.17%)	4,391 (0.25%)	774 (0.04%)	103,499 (5.80%)	65,962 (3.69%)
Dominican	1,414,703 (2.80%/0.46%)	419,016 (29.62%)	182,005 (12.87%)	19,183 (1.36%)	4,056 (0.29%)	1,279 (0.09%)	651,339 (46.04%)	137,825 (9.74%)
Puerto Rican	4,623,716 (9.16%/1.50%)	2,455,534 (53.11%)	403,372 (8.72%)	42,504 (0.92%)	24,312 (0.53%)	10,761 (0.23%)	1,284,425 (27.78%)	402,808 (8.71%)
All other Hispanic	4,087,656 (8.10%/1.32%)	2,018,397 (49.38%)	112,521 (2.75%)	75,976 (1.86%)	50,299 (1.23%)	10,448 (0.26%)	1,441,330 (35.26%)	378,685 (9.26%)

Hispanic or Latino 2010–2017 Estimates: Numbers (% in group/% in USA)
Year	USA total	Hispanic or Latino	White	Black	Asian	American Indian and Alaska Native	Native Hawaiian and Other Pacific Islander	Some other race	Two or more races	Mexican	Puerto Rican	Cuban	Other Hispanic
2010	309 349 689	50,740,089 (16.40%)	32,468,060 (63.99%/10.50%)	977,101 (1.93%/0.32%)	162,038 (0.32%/0.05%)	479,043 (0.94%/0.15%)	33,117 (0.07%/0.01%)	14,331,229 (28.24%/4.63%)	2,289,501 (4.51%/0.74%)	32,929,683 (64.90%/10.64%)	4,691,890 (9.25%/1.52%)	1,873,585 (3.69%/0.61%)	11,244,931 (22.16%/3.64%)
2011	311,591,919	51,939,916 (16.67%)	33,754,452 (64.99%/10.83%)	1,040,652 (2.00%/0.33%)	165,431 (0.32%/0.05%)	460,011 (0.89%/0.15%)	36,076 (0.07%/0.01%)	14,202,943 (27.34%/4.56%)	2,280,351 (4.39%/0.73%)	33,557,922 (64.61%/10.77%)	4,885,294 (9.41%/1.57%)	1,891,014 (3.64%/0.61%)	11,605,686 (22.34%/3.72%)
2012	313,914,040	52,961,017 (16.87%)	34,748,954 (65.61%/11.14%)	1,158,946 (2.19%/0.37%)	180,070 (0.34%/0.06%)	479,033 (0.90%/0.15%)	45,391 (0.09%/0.01%)	13,947,953 (26.34%/4.44%)	2,400,670 (4.53%/0.76%)	34,038,599 (64.27%/10.84%)	4,970,604 (9.39%/1.58%)	1,957,557 (3.70%/0.62%)	11,994,257 (22.65%/3.82%)
2013	316,128,839	53,986,412 (17.08%)	35,577,490 (65.90%/11.25%)	1,111,616 (2.06%/0.35%)	170,781 (0.32%/0.05%)	461,674 (0.86%/0.15%)	43,322 (0.08%/0.01%)	14,169,602 (26.25%/4.48%)	2,451,927 (4.54%/0.78%)	34,586,088 (64.06%/10.94%)	5,138,109 (9.52%/1.63%)	2,013,155 (3.73%/0.64%)	12,249,060 (22.69%/3.87%)
2014	318,857,056	55,279,452 (17.34%)	36,553,775 (66.13%/11.46%)	1,111,917 (2.01%/0.35%)	173,308 (0.31%/0.05%)	498,292 (0.90%/0.16%)	49,604 (0.09%/0.02%)	14,384,163 (26.02%/4.51%)	2,508,393 (4.54%/0.79%)	35,320,579 (63.89%/11.08%)	5,266,738 (9.53%/1.65%)	2,046,805 (3.70%/0.64%)	12,645,330 (22.88%/3.97%)
2015	321,418,821	56,496,122 (17.58%)	37,405,604 (66.21%/11.64%)	1,097,677 (1.94%/0.34%)	192,684 (0.34%/0.06%)	527,604 (0.93%/0.16%)	52,070 (0.09%/0.02%)	14,676,633 (25.98%/4.57%)	2,543,850 (4.50%/0.79%)	35,797,080 (63.36%/11.14%)	5,372,759 (9.51%/1.67%)	2,106,501 (3.73%/0.66%)	13,219,782 (23.40%/4.11%)
2016	323,127,515	57,398,719 (17.76%)	37,164,589 (64.75%/11.50%)	1,176,242 (2.05%/0.36%)	211,742 (0.37%/0.07%)	550,764 (0.96%/0.17%)	62,311 (0.11%/0.02%)	15,576,077 (27.14%/4.82%)	2,656,994 (4.63%/0.82%)	36,255,589 (63.16%/11.22%)	5,450,472 (9.50%/1.69%)	2,212,566 (3.85%/0.68%)	13,480,092 (23.49%/4.17%)
2017	325,719,178	58,846,134 (18.07%)	38,222,255 (64.95%/11.73%)	1,263,898 (2.15%/0.39%)	215,482 (0.37%/0.07%)	581,116 (0.99%/0.18%)	61,441 (0.10%/0.02%)	15,719,042 (26.71%/4.83%)	2,782,900 (4.73%/0.84%)	36,668,018 (62.31%/11.26%)	5,588,664 (9.50%/1.72%)	2,315,863 (3.94%/0.71%)	14,273,589 (24.26%/4.38%)

=== Asian 2000–2017 (Estimates) ===
Asian population (2000 and 2010)

Asian group	Asian alone 2000 (% in USA in Total/% in Asian group)	Asian alone 2010 (% in USA in Total/% in Asian group)	Asian in combination with other races 2000 (% in group)	Asian in combination with other races 2010 (% in group)	Asian alone or in combination with other races 2000 (% in USA in Total/% in Asian group)	Asian alone or in combination with other races 2010 (% in USA in Total/% in Asian group)
Total	10,242,998 (3.64%)	14,674,252 (4.75%)	1,655,830 (13.81%)	2,646,604 (15.28%)	11,989,828 (4.26%)	17,320,856 (5.61%)
Asian Indian	1,718,778 (0.61%/16.78%)	2,918,807 (0.95%/19.89%)	180,821 (9.52%)	264,256 (8.30%)	1,899,599 (0.68%/15.84%)	3,183,063 (1.03%/18.38%)
Bangladeshi	46,905 (0.02%/0.46%)	142,080 (0.05%/0.97%)	10,507 (18.30%)	5,220 (3.54%)	57,412 (0.02%/0.48%)	147,300 (0.05%/0.85%)
Bhutanese	192 (<0.01%/<0.01%)	18,814 (0.01%/0.13%)	20 (9.43%)	625 (3.22%)	212 (<0.01%/<0.01%	19,439 (0.01%/0.11%)
Burmese	14,620 (0.01%/0.14%)	95,536 (0.03%/0.65%)	2,100 (12.56%)	4,664 (4.65%)	16,720 (0.01%/0.14%)	100,200 (0.03%/0.58%)
Cambodian	183,769 (0.07%/1.79%)	255,497 (0.08%/1.74%)	22,283 (10.81%)	21,170 (7.65%)	206,052 (0.07%/1.72%)	276,667 (0.09%/1.60%)
Chinese	2,564,190 (0.91%/25.03%)	3,535,382 (1.15%/24.09%)	301,042 (10.51%)	474,732 (11.84%)	2,865,232 (1.02%/23.90%)	4,010,114 (1.30%/23.15%)
Chinese except Taiwanese	2,432,046 (0.86%/23.74%)	3,322,350 (1.08%/22.64%)	288,391 (10.60%)	457,382 (12.10%)	2,720,437 (0.97%/22.69%)	3,779,732 (1.22%/21.82%)
Taiwanese	118,827 (0.04%/1.16%)	199,192 (0.06%/1.36%)	11,564 (8.87%)	16,249 (7.54%)	130,391 (0.05%/1.09%)	215,441 (0.07%/1.24%)
Filipino	1,908,125 (0.68%/18.63%)	2,649,973 (0.86%/18.06%)	456,690 (19.31%)	766,867 (22.44%)	2,364,815 (0.84%/19.72%)	3,416,840 (1.11%/19.73%)
Hmong	174,712 (0.06%/1.71%)	252,323 (0.08%/1.72%)	11,598 (6.23%)	7,750 (2.98%)	186,310 (0.07%/1.55%)	260,073 (0.08%/1.50%)
Indonesian	44,186 (0.02%/0.43%)	70,096 (0.02%/0.48%)	18,887 (29.94%)	25,174 (26.42%)	63,073 (0.02%/0.53%)	95,270 (0.03%/0.55%)
Iwo Jiman	18 (<0.01%/<0.01%)	2 (<0.01%/<0.01%)	60 (76.92%)	10 (83.33%)	78 (<0.01%/<0.01%)	12 (<0.01%/<0.01%)
Japanese	852,237 (0.30%/8.32%)	841,824 (0.27%/5.74%)	296,695 (25.82%)	462,462 (35.46%)	1,148,932 (0.41%/9.58%)	1,304,286 (0.42%/7.53%)
Korean	1,099,422 (0.39%/10.73%)	1,463,474 (0.47%/9.97%)	129,005 (10.50%)	243,348 (14.26%)	1,228,427 (0.44%/10.25%)	1,706,822 (0.55%/9.85%)
Laotian	179,103 (0.06%/1.75%)	209,646 (0.07%/1.43%)	19,100 (9.64%)	22,484 (9.69%)	198,203 (0.07%/1.65%)	232,130 (0.08%/1.34%)
Malaysian	15,029 (0.01%/0.15%)	21,868 (0.01%/0.15%)	3,537 (19.05%)	4,311 (16.47%)	18,566 (0.01%/0.15%)	26,179 (0.01%/0.15%)
Maldivian	29 (<0.01%/<0.01%)	102 (<0.01%/<0.01%)	22 (43.14%)	25 (19.69%)	51 (<0.01%/<0.01%)	127 (<0.01%/<0.01%)
Mongolian	3,699 (<0.01%/0.04%)	15,138 (<0.01%/0.10%)	2,169 (36.96%)	3,206 (17.48%)	5,868 (<0.01%/0.05%)	18,344 (0.01%/0.11%)
Nepalese	8,209 (<0.01%/0.08%)	57,209 (0.02%/0.39%)	1,190 (12.66%)	2,281 (3.83%)	9,399 (<0.01%/0.08%)	59,490 (0.02%/0.34%)
Okinawan	6,138 (<0.01%/0.06%)	5,681 (<0.01%/0.04%)	4,461 (42.09%)	5,645 (49.84%)	10,599 (<0.01%/0.09%)	11,326 (<0.01%/0.07%)
Pakistani	164,628 (0.06%/1.61%)	382,994 (0.12%/2.61%)	39,681 (19.42%)	26,169 (6.40%)	204,309 (0.07%/1.70%)	409,163 (0.13%/2.36%)
Singaporean	2,017 (<0.01%/0.02%)	4,569 (<0.01%/0.03%)	377 (15.75%)	778 (14.55%)	2,394 (<0.01%/0.02%)	5,347 (<0.01%/0.03%)
Sri Lankan	21,364 (0.01%/0.21%)	41,456 (0.01%/0.28%)	3,223 (13.11%)	3,925 (8.65%)	24,587 (0.01%/0.21%)	45,381 (0.01%/0.26%)
Thai	120,918 (0.04%/1.18%)	182,872 (0.06%/1.25%)	29,365 (19.54%)	54,711 (23.03%)	150,283 (0.05%/1.25%)	237,583 (0.07%/1.37%)
Vietnamese	1,169,672 (0.42%/11.42%)	1,632,717 (0.53%/11.13%)	54,064 (4.42%)	104,716 (6.03%)	1,223,736 (0.43%/10.21%)	1,737,433 (0.56%/10.03%)
Other Asian, not specified	162,913 (1,59%)	238,332 (1.62%)	213,810 (56,76%)	385,429 (61,79%)	376,723 (3,14%)	623,761 (3,60%)
All South Asians	1,960,105 (19,14%)	3,519,391 (23.98%)	235,464 (10,72%)	302,501 (7,91%)	2,195,569 (18,31%)	3,821,892 (22,07%)
All Northeast and Southeast Asians	8,119,980 (79,27%)	10,916,529 (74.39%)	1,206,556 (12,94%)	1,958,674 (15,21%)	9,326,536 (77,79%)	12,875,203 (74,33%)

Asian population pyramids (Census 2010)
Age group	Asian alone 4.75% (percent in the race/percent in USA)	Asian Indian alone (0,92% in USA/19,38% in group) (percent in the group/percent in Asian alone group)	Chinese alone (1,08% in USA/22,81% in group) (percent in the group/percent in Asian alone group)	Japanese alone (0,25% in USA/5,20% in group) (percent in the group/percent in Asian alone group)	Asian alone, other* (2,50% in USA/52,61% in group) (percent in the group/percent in Asian alone group)
Population	14,674,252	2,843,391	3,347,229	763,325	7,720,307
0–4	898,011 (6.1%/4.45%)	239,745 (8.43%/26.70%)	166,058 (4.96%/18.49%)	20,999 (2.75%/2.34%)	471,209 (6.10%/52.47%)
5–9	928,248 (6.3%/4.56%)	205,562 (7.23%/22.15%)	196,879 (5.88%/21.21%)	23,010 (3.01%/2.48%)	502,797 (6.51%/54.17%)
10–14	881,590 (6.0%/4.26%)	160,602 (5.65%/18.22%)	187,438 (5.60%/21.26%)	22,976 (3.01%/2.61%)	510,574 (6.61%/57.92%)
15–19	956,028 (6.5%/4.34%)	148,008 (5.21%/15.48%)	210,220 (6.28%/21.99%)	27,288 (3.57%/2.85%)	570,512 (7.39%/59.68%)
20–24	1,106,222 (7.5%/5.12%)	196,704 (6.92%/17.78%)	268,226 (8.01%/24.25%)	35,953 (4.71%/3.25%)	605,339 (7.84%/54.74%)
25–29	1,234,322 (8.4%/5.85%)	325,474 (11.45%/27.37%)	252,212 (7.53%/20.43%)	38,115 (4.99%/3.09%)	618,521 (8.01%/50.11%)
30–34	1,240,906 (8.5%/6.22%)	351,838 (12.37%/28.35%)	244,035 (7.29%/19.67%)	49,264 (6.45%/3.97%)	595,769 (7.72%/48.01%)
35–39	1,296,301 (8.8%/6.42%)	288,633 (10.15%/22.27%)	265,020 (7.92%/20.44%)	60,985 (7.99%/4.70%)	681,663 (8.83%/52.59%)
40–44	1,155,565 (7.9%/5.53%)	213,768 (7.52%/18.50%)	261,082 (7.80%/22.59%)	61,640 (8.08%/5.33%)	619,075 (8.02%/53.57%)
45–49	1,076,060 (7.3%/4.74%)	167,387 (5.89%/15.56%)	286,875 (8.57%/26.66%)	65,565 (8.59%/6.09%)	556,233 (7.20%/51.69%)
50–54	980,282 (6.7%/4.40%)	142,827 (5.02%/14.57%)	251,059 (7.50%/25.61%)	65,126 (8.53%/6.64%)	521,270 (6.75%/53.18%)
55–59	844,490 (5.8%/4.29%)	124,549 (4.38%/14.75%)	219,708 (6.56%/26.02%)	59,880 (7.84%/7.09%)	440,353 (5.70%/52.14%)
60–64	689,601 (4.7%/4.10%)	104,867 (3.69%/15.21%)	171,656 (5.13%/24.89%)	53,833 (7.05%/7.81%)	359,245 (5.65%/52.09%)
65–69	474,327 (3.2%/3.81%)	73,314 (2.58%/15.46%)	106,541 (3.18%/22.46%)	39,724 (5.20%/8.37%)	254,748 (3.30%/53.71%)
70–74	354,268 (2.4%/3.82%)	48,553 (1.71%/13.71%)	93,883 (2.80%/26.50%)	32,584 (4.27%/9.20%)	179,248 (2.32%/50.60%)
75–79	251,210 (1.7%/3.43%)	27,446 (0.97%/10.93%)	72,308 (2.16%/28.78%)	39,345 (5.15%/15.66%)	112,111 (1.45%/44.63%)
80–84	168,879 (1.2%/2.94%)	14,570 (0.51%/8.63%)	50,173 (1.50%/29.71%)	34,819 (4.56%/20.62%)	69,317 (0.90%/41.05%)
85+	137,942 (0.9%/2.51%)	9,544 (0.34%/6.92%)	43,856 (1.31%/31.79%)	32,219 (4.22%/23.36%)	52,323 (0.68%/37.93%)

* Only about 10% from these category are people from South Asia, rest are from Northeast or Southeast Asia

Year	USA	Asian	Asian Indian (in group/in USA)	Chinese (in group/in USA)	Filipino (in group/in USA)	Japanese (in group/in USA)	Korean (in group/in USA)	Vietnamese (in group/in USA)	Other Asian (in group/in USA)
2010	309,349,689	14,728,302 (4.76%)	2,765,155 (18.77%/0.89%)	3,456,912 (23.47%/1.12%)	2,512,686 (17.06%/0.81%)	774,600 (5.26%/0.25%)	1,456,076 (9.89%/0.47%)	1,625,365 (11.04%/0.53%)	2,137,508 (14.51%/0.69%)
2011	311,591,919	15,020,419 (4.82%)	2,908,204 (19.36%/0.93%)	3,520,150 (23.44%/1.13%)	2,538,325 (16.90%/0.81%)	756,898 (5.04%/0.24%)	1,449,876 (9.65%/0.47%)	1,669,447 (11.11%/0.54%)	2,177,519 (14.50%/0.70%)
2012	313,914,040	15,555,530 (4.96%)	3,049,201 (19.60%/0.97%)	3,660,659 (23.53%/1.17%)	2,658,354 (17.09%/0.85%)	780,210 (5.02%/0.25%)	1,450,401 (9.32%/0.46%)	1,675,246 (10.77%/0.53%)	2,281,459 (14.67%/0.73%)
2013	316,128,839	16,012,120 (5.07%)	3,189,485 (19.92%/1.01%)	3,781,673 (23.62%,1.20%)	2,664,606 (16.64%/0.84%)	794,441 (4.96%/0.25%)	1,446,592 (9.03%/0.46%)	1,692,760 (10.57%/0.54%)	2,442,563 (15.25%/0.77%)
2014	318,857,056	16,686,960 (5.23%)	3,491,052 (20.92%/1.09%)	3,941,615 (23.62%/1.24%)	2,770,918 (16.61%/0.87%)	759,056 (4.55%/0.24%)	1,476,577 (8.85%/0.46%)	1,714,143 (10.27%/0.54%)	2,533,599 (15.18%/0.79%)
2015	321,418,821	17,273,777 (5.37%)	3,699,957 (21.42%/1.15%)	4,133,674 (23.93%/1.29%)	2,848,148 (16.49%/0.89%)	757,468 (4.39%/0.24%)	1,460,483 (8.45%/0.45%)	1,738,848 (10.07%/0.54%)	2,635,199 (15.26%/0.82%)
2016	323,127,515	17,556,935 (5.43%)	3,813,407 (21.72%/1.18%)	4,214,856 (24.01%/1.30%)	2,811,885 (16.02%/0.87%)	789,830 (4.50%/0.24%)	1,438,915 (8.20%/0.45%)	1,803,575 (10.27%/0.56%)	2,684,467 (15.29%/0.83%)
2017	325,719,178	18,215,328 (5.59%)	4,094,539 (22.48%/1.26%)	4,344,981 (23.85%/1.33%)	2,911,668 (15.98%/0.89%)	770,546 (4.23%/0.24%)	1,477,282 (8.11%/0.45%)	1,826,998 (10.03%/0.56%)	2,789,314 (15.31%/0.86%)

=== American Indian and Alaska Native 2010–2017 (Estimates) ===
Year	USA	American Indian and Alaska Native	Cherokee tribal grouping (in group/in USA)	Chippewa tribal grouping (in group/in USA)	Navajo tribal grouping (in group/in USA)	Sioux tribal grouping (in group/in USA)	Other (in group/in USA)
2010	309,349,689	2,553,566 (0.83%)	285,476 (11.18%/0.09%)	115,859 (4.54%/0.04%)	308,013 (12.06%/0.10%)	131,048 (5.13%/0.04%)	1,713,170 (67.09%/0.55%)
2011	311,591,919	2,547,006 (0.82%)	266,224 (10.45%/0.09%)	119,868 (4.71%/0.04%)	305,559 (12.00%/0.10%)	129,382 (5.08%/0.04%)	1,725,973 (67.76%/0.55%)
2012	313,914,040	2,563,505 (0.82%)	276,381 (10.78%/0.09%)	113,262 (4.42%/0.04%)	312,039 (12.17%/0.10%)	121,503 (4.74%/0.04%)	1,740,320 (67.89%/0.55%)
2013	316,128,839	2,521,131 (0.80%)	279,419 (11.08%/0.09%)	111,939 (4.44%/0.04%)	304,744 (12.09%/0.10%)	126,485 (5.02%/0.04%)	1,698,544 (67.37%/0.54%)
2014	318,857,056	2,601,714 (0.82%)	282,867 (10.87%/0.09%)	115,987 (4.46%/0.04%)	320,603 (12.32%/0.10%)	125,790 (4.83%/0.04%)	1,756,467 (67.51%/0.55%)
2015	321,418,821	2,597,249 (0.81%)	284,858 (10.97%/0.09%)	115,280 (4.44%/0.04%)	323,757 (12.47%/0.10%)	117,019 (4.51%/0.04%)	1,756,335 (67.62%/0.55%)
2016	323,127,515	2,676,399 (0.83%)	287,748 (10.75%/0.09%)	126,524 (4.73%/0.04%)	314,679 (11.76%/0.10%)	126,015 (4.71%/0.04%)	1,821,433 (68.06%/0.56%)
2017	325,719,178	2,726,278 (0.84%)	291,434 (10.69%/0.09%)	118,195 (4.34%/0.04%)	329,207 (12.08%/0.10%)	112,575 (4.13%/0.03%)	1,874,867 (68.77%/0.58%)

=== Native Hawaiian and Other Pacific Islander 2010–2017 (Estimates) ===
Year	USA	Native Hawaiian and Other Pacific Islander (in USA)	Native Hawaiian (in group/in USA)	Guamanian or Chamorro (in group/in USA)	Samoan (in group/in USA)	Other Pacific Islander (in group/in USA)
2010	309,349,689	507,916 (0.16%)	157,029 (30.92%/0.05%)	72,807 (14.33%/0.02%)	114,796 (22.60%/0.04%)/	163,284 (32.15%/0.05%)
2011	311,591,919	506,017 (0.16%)	156,239 (30.88%/0.05%)	64,192 (12.69%/0.02%)	108,849 (21.51%%/0.03%)	176,737 (34.93%/0.06%)
2012	313,914,040	543,198 (0.17%)	175,299 (32.27%/0.06%)	72,738 (13.39%/0.02%)	103,079 (18.98%/0.03%)	192,082 (35.36%/0.06%)
2013	316,128,839	525,750 (0.17%)	179,489 (34.14%/0.06%)	63,655 (12.11%/0.02%)	105,235 (20.02%/0.03%)	177,371 (33.74%/0.06%)
2014	318,857,056	557,154 (0.17%)	180,203 (32.34%/0.06%)	73,811 (13.25%/0.02%)	114,288 (20.51%/0.04%)	188,852 (33.90%/0.06%)
2015	321,418,821	554,946 (0.17%)	176,482 (31.80%/0.05%)	78,522 (14.15%/0.02%)	120,019 (21.63%/0.04%)	179,923 (32.42%/0.06%)
2016	323,127,515	595,986 (0.18%)	178,874 (30.01%/0.06%)	82,398 (13.83%/0.03%)	119,605 (20.07%/0.04%)	215,109 (36.09%/0.07%)
2017	325,719,178	608,219 (0.19%)	191,739 (31.52%/0.06%)	85,771 (14.10%/0.03%)	105,076 (17.28%/0.03%)	225,633 (37.10%/0.07%)

=== Immigration to the United States ===
Immigration to the United States by region and country:

Region	2025	2024	2023	2022	2021	2020	2019	2018	2017	2016	2015	2014	2013	2012	2011	2010	2009	2008	2007	2006	2005	2004	2003	2002	2001	2000	1999
All immigrants			1,172,910	1,018,349	740,002	707,362	1,031,765	1,096,611	1,127,167	1,183,505	1,051,031	1,016,518	990,553	1,031,631	1,062,040	1,042,625	1,130,818	1,107,126	1,052,415	1,266,129	1,122,257	957,883	703,542	1,059,356	1,058,902	841,002	644,787
Americas			562,440	431,697	311,806	284,491	461,710	497,860	492,682	506,852	438,388	397,718	396,598	407,169	419,996	423,784	478,108	491,805	445,879	552,056	448,689	414,523	304,990	477,092	474,112	394,779	312,160
South Asia				164,438	118,228	76,514	96,931	107,237	108,677	121,715	116,765	132,600	117,655	119,383	123,625	117,499	102,633	100,894	96,283	99,433	116,181	94,631	67,630	92,689	96,041	65,345	51,036
Northeast Asia				96,787	71,566	68,809	93,945	95,088	103,469	117,316	104,861	109,930	109,383	116,986	125,401	109,290	109,532	126,204	118,325	131,300	118,164	95,913	69,412	105,904	106,797	82,781	60,766
Greater Middle East				94,861	59,316	68,871	85,446	106,219	111,804	117,882	100,336	99,025	77,763	86,034	89,611	90,376	92,154	77,820	70,929	87,820	76,671	57,758	42,201	60,769	61,410	50,463	40,129
Southeast Asia				76,274	56,130	69,886	104,848	104,517	118,192	125,225	116,041	106,527	111,306	121,834	127,193	120,840	125,338	108,833	127,579	139,130	114,659	105,582	78,819	100,170	104,349	81,664	59,967
Europe			80,280	75,671	61,508	68,984	87,585	80,024	84,327	93,556	83,630	83,259	86,675	81,775	83,736	88,732	105,528	103,853	106,625	146,359	165,076	124,928	94,018	164,443	165,712	124,598	87,815
Sub-Saharan Africa				72,062	55,097	64,938	94,472	99,500	101,143	93,326	82,458	80,623	82,609	92,478	86,028	85,282	110,551	91,041	79,283	99,879	70,936	55,315	40,896	50,127	42,070	35,072	28,086
Oceania			5,000	5,105	4,131	3,980	5,340	4,653	5,049	5,577	5,385	5,098	5,265	4,728	4,962	5,337	5,563	5,254	6,090	7,372	6,526	5,967	4,335	5,482	6,052	5,089	3,636

Top 10 sending countries:

Number	2025	2024	2023	2022	2021	2020	2019	2018	2017	2016	2015	2014	2013	2012	2011	2010	2009	2008	2007	2006	2005	2004	2003	2002	2001	2000	1999
Total			1,172,910	1,018,349	740,002	707,362	1,031,765	1,096,611	1,127,167	1,183,505	1,051,031	1,016,518	990,553	1,031,631	1,062,040	1,042,625	1,130,818	1,107,126	1,052,415	1,266,129	1,122,257	957,883	703,542	1,059,356	1,058,902	841,002	644,787
1.			M. 180,530	M. 138,772	M. 107,230	M. 100,325	M. 156,052	M. 161,858	M. 170,581	M. 174,534	M. 158,619	M. 134,052	M. 135,028	M. 146,406	M. 143,446	M. 139,120	M. 164,920	M. 189,989	M. 148,640	M. 173,749	M. 161,445	M. 175,411	M. 115,585	M. 218,822	M. 205,560	M. 173,493	M. 147,402
2.			Cu. 81,600	I. 127,012	I. 93,450	I. 46,363	Ch. 62,248	Cu. 76,486	Ch. 71,565	Ch. 81,772	Ch. 74,558	I. 77,908	Ch. 71,798	Ch. 81,784	Ch. 87,016	Ch. 70,863	Ch. 64,238	Ch. 80,271	Ch. 76,655	Ch. 87,307	I. 84,680	I. 70,151	I. 50,228	I. 70,823	I. 70,032	Ch. 45,585	Ch. 32,159
3.			I. 78,070	Ch. 67,950	Ch. 49,847	Ch. 41,483	I. 54,495	Ch. 65,214	Cu. 65,028	Cu. 66,516	I. 64,116	Ch. 76,089	I. 68,458	I. 66,434	I. 69,013	I. 69,162	P. 60,029	I. 63,352	P. 72,596	P. 74,606	Ch. 69,933	P. 57,846	P. 45,250	Ch. 61,082	Ch. 56,267	P. 42,343	P. 30,943
4.			D.R. 68,870	D.R. 40,152	P. 27,511	D.R. 30,005	D.R. 49,911	I. 59,821	I. 60,394	I. 64,687	P. 56,478	P. 49,996	P. 54,446	P. 57,327	P. 57,011	P. 58,173	I. 57,304	P. 54,030	I. 65,353	I. 61,369	P. 60,746	Ch. 55,494	Ch. 40,568	P. 51,040	P. 52,919	I. 41,903	I. 30,157
5.			Ch. 59,260	Cu. 36,642	D.R. 24,553	V. 29,995	P. 45,920	D.R. 57,413	D.R. 58,520	D.R. 61,161	Cu. 54,396	Cu. 46,679	D.R. 41,311	D.R. 41,566	D.R. 46,109	D.R. 53,870	D.R. 49,414	Cu. 49,500	Col. 33,187	Cu. 45,614	Cu. 36,261	V. 31,524	E.S. 28,231	V. 33,563	V. 35,419	V. 26,553	V. 20,335
6.			P. 49,200	P. 35,998	Cu. 23,077	P. 25,491	Cu. 41,641	P. 47,258	P. 49,147	P. 53,287	D.R. 50,610	D.R. 44,577	Cu. 32,219	Cu. 32,820	Cu. 36,452	Cu. 33,573	Cu. 38,954	D.R. 31,879	H. 30,405	Col. 43,144	V. 32,784	D.R. 30,506	D.R. 26,159	E.S. 31,060	E.S. 31,089	E.S. 22,543	D.R. 17,811
7.			V. 36,000	E.S. 30,876	E.S. 18,668	E.S. 17,907	V. 39,712	V. 33,834	V. 38,231	V. 41,451	V. 30,832	V. 30,283	V. 27,101	V. 28,304	V. 34,157	V. 30,632	V. 29,234	V. 31,497	Cu. 29,104	D.R. 38,068	D.R. 27,503	E.S. 29,807	V. 22,087	Cu. 28,182	Cu. 27,453	H. 22,337	H. 16,514
8.			Af. 30,300	V. 24,425	Br. 18,351	Br. 16,746	E.S. 27,656	E.S. 28,326	E.S. 25,109	H. 23,584	Ir 21,107	K. 20,565	K. 23,214	H. 22,818	K. 22,860	H. 22,582	Col. 27,849	Col. 30,213	V. 28,691	E.S. 31,782	K. 26,562	Cu. 20,488	Col. 14,720	B.-H. 25,329	H. 27,031	N. 20,947	J. 14,693
9.			Br. 28,880	Br. 24,169	V. 16,312	Cu. 16,367	J. 21,689	H. 21,360	J. 21,905	E.S. 23,449	E.S. 19,487	E.S. 19,273	Col. 21,131	Col. 20,931	Col. 22,635	Col. 22,406	K. 25,926	K. 26,666	D.R. 28,024	V. 30,691	Col. 25,566	K. 19,766	G. 14,386	D.R. 22,515	B.-H. 23,594	Cu. 18,960	E.S. 14,581
10.			E.S. 26,210	Col. 21,723	Col. 15,293	K. 16,272	K. 18,508	J. 20,347	H. 21,824	J. 23,350	Pa 18,057	Ir. 19,153	H. 20,351	K. 20,895	H. 22,111	K. 22,262	H. 24,280	H. 26,007	K. 22,405	J. 24,976	U. 22,745	G. 18,920	R. 13,935	U. 21,190	Can. 21,752	D.R. 17,465	Cu. 14,019

- M.- Mexico, Ch.- China, I.- India, P.- Philippines, D.R.- Dominican Republic, Cu.- Cuba, V.- Vietnam, K.- Korea (South & North), Col.- Colombia, H. – Haiti, E.S. – El Salvador, J. – Jamaica, U- Ukraine, G. – Guatemala, R.- Russian Federation, N. – Nicaragua, B.-H. – Bosnia-Herzegovina, Can. – Canada, Ir – Iraq, Pa – Pakistan, Br. - Brazil, Af. - Afghanistan

Americas:

Country	2025	2024	2023	2022	2021	2020	2019	2018	2017	2016	2015	2014	2013	2012	2011	2010	2009	2008	2007	2006	2005	2004	2003	2002	2001	2000	1999
Total from the Americas			562 440	431 697	311 806	284 491	461 710	497 860	492 682	506 852	438 388	397 718	396 598	407 169	419 996	423 784	478 108	491 805	445 879	552 056	448 689	414 523	304 990	477 092	474 112	394 779	312 160
Mexico			180 530	138 772	107 230	100 325	156 052	161 858	170 581	174 534	158 619	134 052	135 028	146 406	143 446	139 120	164 920	189 989	148 640	173 749	161 445	175 411	115 585	218 822	205 560	173 493	147 402
Dominican Republic			68 870	40 152	24 553	30 005	49 911	57 413	58 520	61 161	50 610	44 577	41 311	41 566	46 109	53 870	49 414	31 879	28 024	38 068	27 503	30 506	26 159	22 515	21 195	17 465	17 811
Cuba			81 600	36 642	23 077	16 367	41 641	76 486	65 028	66 516	54 396	46 679	32 219	32 820	36 452	33 573	38 954	49 500	29 104	45 614	36 261	20 488	9 262	28 182	27 453	18 960	14 019
El Salvador			26 210	30 876	18 668	17 907	27 656	28 326	25 109	23 449	19 487	19 273	18 260	16 256	18 667	18 806	19 909	19 659	21 127	31 782	21 359	29 807	28 231	31 060	31 089	22 543	14 581
Brazil				24 169	18 351	16 746	19 825	15 394	14 989	13 812	11 424	10 429	11 033	11 441	11 763	12 258	14 701	12 195	14 295	17 903	16 662	10 556	6 331	9 439	9 448	6 943	3 887
Colombia				21 723	15 293	11 989	19 841	17 545	17 956	18 610	17 316	18 175	21 131	20 931	22 635	22 406	27 849	30 213	33 187	43 144	25 566	18 846	14 720	18 758	16 627	14 427	9 928
Venezuela				21 025	14 412	12 136	15 720	11 762	11 809	10 772	9 144	8 427	9 572	9 387	9 183	9 409	11 154	10 514	10 692	11 341	10 645	6 220	4 018	5 228	5 170	4 693	2 498
Honduras				17 099	10 116	8 277	15 901	13 794	11 387	13 302	9 274	8 156	8 898	6 884	6 133	6 448	6 404	6 540	7 646	8 177	7 012	5 508	4 645	6 435	6 571	5 917	4 793
Guatemala				16 990	8 904	7 815	13 453	15 638	13 198	13 002	11 773	10 238	10 224	10 341	11 092	10 467	12 187	16 182	17 908	24 133	16 818	18 920	14 386	16 178	13 496	9 942	7 294
Jamaica				16 482	13 357	12 826	21 689	20 347	21 905	23 350	17 642	19 026	19 400	20 705	19 662	19 825	21 783	18 477	19 375	24 976	18 345	14 430	13 347	14 835	15 322	15 949	14 693
Ecuador				11 910	7 532	6 157	11 083	11 472	10 594	10 757	10 187	10 960	10 591	9 342	11 103	11 492	12 128	11 663	12 248	17 489	11 608	8 626	7 066	10 561	9 665	7 651	8 882
Canada				11 317	9 978	9 526	11 388	9 898	11 484	12 793	12 673	11 586	13 181	12 932	12 800	13 328	16 140	15 109	15 495	18 207	21 878	15 569	11 350	19 352	21 752	16 057	8 782
Haiti				10 432	11 456	9 338	17 253	21 360	21 824	23 584	16 967	15 274	20 351	22 818	22 111	22 582	24 280	26 007	30 405	22 226	14 524	14 191	12 293	20 213	27 031	22 337	16 514
Peru				8 035	5 044	5 626	10 049	9 878	10 115	10 940	10 148	10 606	12 564	12 609	14 064	14 247	16 957	15 184	17 699	21 718	15 676	11 794	9 409	11 918	11 062	9 579	8 414
Argentina				4 128	3 248	2 970	3 925	3 080	3 482	4 091	3 730	3 874	4 372	4 359	4 473	4 399	5 780	5 353	5 645	7 327	7 081	4 805	3 129	3 661	3 297	2 317	1 387
Nicaragua				3 754	4 220	2 570	3 818	3 061	3 072	3 486	3 324	2 886	3 048	3 046	3 401	3 565	4 137	3 614	3 716	4 145	3 305	4 009	4 094	10 659	19 634	20 947	13 327
Guyana				3 455	3 435	3 027	5 385	5 165	5 468	5 771	5 543	6 267	5 897	5 683	6 599	6 749	6 670	6 823	5 726	9 552	9 317	6 351	6 809	9 938	8 279	5 719	3 290
Trinidad and Tobago				2 435	1 852	1 718	3 150	2 758	3 100	3 469	3 212	3 988	4 724	5 214	5 023	5 435	6 256	5 937	6 829	8 854	6 568	5 384	4 138	5 738	6 618	6 635	4 259
Costa Rica				2 167	1 991	1 658	2 348	2 171	2 184	2 224	2 029	1 966	2 114	2 020	2 135	2 164	2 384	2 090	2 540	3 109	2 278	1 755	1 246	1 591	1 733	1 310	883
Chile				1 747	1 632	1 520	1 762	1 519	1 625	1 698	1 596	1 581	1 736	1 673	1 853	1 950	2 250	2 017	2 274	2 774	2 404	1 810	1 310	1 839	1 921	1 700	1 085
Bolivia				1 621	1 121	976	1 525	1 523	1 510	1 595	1 626	1 719	2 071	1 948	2 173	2 253	2 837	2 436	2 590	4 025	2 197	1 768	1 376	1 664	1 819	1 761	1 444
Panama				952	844	601	1 059	897	889	1 029	1 052	1 095	1 234	1 281	1 374	1 536	1 806	1 678	1 916	2 418	1 815	1 417	1 164	1 680	1 867	1 829	1 640
Bahamas				767	997	614	922	759	725	656	725	654	630	619	668	652	751										
Uruguay				731	830	699	1 109	960	1 001	972	1 078	1 128	1 352	1 374	1 553	1 331	1 775	1 451	1 418	1 664	1 154	787	469	536	541	426	267
Saint Lucia				628	457	463	726	696	777	777	739	844	853	919	785	872	1 027										
Belize				591	670	475	806	632	746	851	772	789	946	847	905	965	1 041										
Dominica				455	279	287	511	492	510	298	229	345	244	125	287	366	484										
Grenada				449	370	307	554	501	544	585	525	633	687	671	579	664	748										
Rest*				2 193	1 880	1 561	2 640	2 475	2 516	2 768	2 548	2 491	2 927	2 952	2 968	3 052	3 382	7 295	7 380	9 661	7 268	5 565	4 453	6 290	6 962	6 179	5 080

* Anguilla, Antigua and Barbuda, Aruba, Barbados, Bermuda, Bonaire, British Virgin Islands, Cayman Islands, Curaçao, French Guiana, Guadeloupe, Martinique, Montserrat, Paraguay, Saba, Saint Barthélemy, Saint Kitts and Nevis, Saint Pierre and Miquelon, Saint Martin, Saint Vincent and the Grenadines, Sint Eustatius, Sint Maarten, Suriname, Turks and Caicos Islands, United States Virgin Islands

South Asia:

Country	2022	2021	2020	2019	2018	2017	2016	2015	2014	2013	2012	2011	2010	2009	2008	2007	2006	2005	2004	2003	2002	2001	2000	1999
Total from South Asia	164 438	118 228	76 514	96 931	107 237	108 677	121 715	116 765	132 600	117 655	119 383	123 625	117 499	102 633	100 894	96 283	99 433	116 181	94 631	67 630	92 689	96 041	65 345	51 036
India	127 012	93 450	46 363	54 495	59 821	60 394	64 687	64 116	77 908	68 458	66 434	69 013	69 162	57 304	63 352	65 353	61 369	84 680	70 151	50 228	70 823	70 032	41 903	30 157
Nepal	12 010	7 309	7 847	10 201	11 953	11 610	12 851	12 926	12 357	13 046	11 312	10 166	7 115	4 514	4 093	3 472	3 733	3 158	2 878	2 095	1 137	945	616	453
Pakistan	11 777	9 691	10 474	13 921	15 802	17 408	19 313	18 057	18 612	13 251	14 740	15 546	18 258	21 555	19 719	13 492	17 418	14 926	12 086	9 415	13 694	16 393	14 504	13 485
Bangladesh	10 858	6 405	9 272	15 176	15 717	14 693	18 723	13 570	14 645	12 099	14 705	16 707	14 819	16 651	11 753	12 074	14 644	11 487	8 061	4 616	5 483	7 152	7 204	6 038
Sri Lanka	2 572	1 232	1 463	1 689	1 594	1 627	1 913	1 763	1 767	1 847	1 994	2 053	2 036	2 009	1 935	1 831	2 191	1 894	1 431	1 246	1 529	1 505	1 118	899
Bhutan	209	137	1 091	1 441	2 350	2 940	4 217	6 325	7 298	8 954	10 198	10 137	6 109	594	42	52	78	30	17	15	14	5	D	4
Maldives	0	4	4	8	4	5	11	8	13	5	3	3	–	6	–	9	–	6	7	15	9	9	–	–

Northeast Asia:

Country	2022	2021	2020	2019	2018	2017	2016	2015	2014	2013	2012	2011	2010	2009	2008	2007	2006	2005	2004	2003	2002	2001	2000	1999
Total from Northeast Asia	96 787	71 566	68 809	93 945	95 088	103 469	117 316	104 861	109 930	109 383	116 986	125 401	109 290	109 532	126 204	118 325	131 300	118 164	95 913	69 412	105 904	106 797	82 781	60 766
China	67 950	49 847	41 483	62 248	65 214	71 565	81 772	74 558	76 089	71 798	81 784	87 016	70 863	64 238	80 271	76 655	87 307	69 933	55 494	40 568	61 082	56 267	45 585	32 159
Korea	16 194	12 371	16 272	18 508	17 676	19 226	21 848	17 193	20 565	23 214	20 895	22 860	22 262	25 926	26 666	22 405	24 386	26 562	19 766	12 382	20 724	20 532	15 721	12 795
Taiwan	5 091	3 246	4 759	5 801	5 079	4 858	5 120	4 888	4 697	5 385	5 331	6 154	6 732	8 038	9 073	8 990	8 086	9 196	9 005	6 917	9 775	12 120	9 019	6 700
Japan	4 184	3 960	3 905	4 503	4 317	4 635	5 207	5 395	5 545	5 925	6 061	6 161	6 264	7 690	6 821	6 748	8 265	8 768	7 697	5 971	8 248	9 578	7 049	4 202
Hong Kong	2 301	1 334	1 783	2 021	2 075	2 415	2 510	2 085	2 278	2 226	2 104	2 306	2 432	2 651	3 373	3 527	3 256	3 705	3 951	3 574	6 075	8 300	5 407	4 910
Mongolia	1 005	762	543	765	636	661	750	644	651	729	691	774	594	831										
Macau	62	46	64	99	91	109	109	99	105	106	120	130	143	158										

Greater Middle East:

Country	2022	2021	2020	2019	2018	2017	2016	2015	2014	2013	2012	2011	2010	2009	2008	2007	2006	2005	2004	2003	2002	2001	2000	1999
Total from the Greater Middle East	94 861	59 316	68 871	85 446	106 219	111 804	117 882	100 336	99 025	77 763	86 034	89 611	90 376	92 154	77 820	70 929	87 820	76 671	57 758	42 201	60 769	61 410	50 463	40 129
Afghanistan	14 193	9 488	11 407	10 136	12 935	19 538	12 513	8 328	10 527	2 196	1 617	1 648	2 017	3 165	2 813	1 753	3 417	4 749	2 137	1 252	1 759	1 202	1 011	877
Iran	9 407	5 734	8 805	6 640	10 116	13 791	13 298	13 114	11 615	12 863	12 916	14 822	14 182	18 553	13 852	10 460	13 947	13 887	10 434	7 230	12 960	10 425	8 487	7 176
Egypt	8 348	4 396	6 164	9 479	9 826	9 834	12 045	12 085	11 477	10 294	8 988	7 778	8 978	8 844	8 712	9 267	10 500	7 905	5 522	3 348	4 852	5 159	4 450	4 421
Turkey	7 001	4 465	4 359	5 713	5 585	4 844	4 469	4 201	3 834	4 144	4 162	4 403	4 483	4 958	4 210	4 425	4 941	4 614	3 835	3 029	3 375	3 215	2 606	2 215
Yemen	5 648	4 345	5 908	3 717	1 885	6 029	13 040	3 194	3 492	3 532	2 620	3 361	3 591	3 134	1 872	2 396	4 308	3 366	1 760	1 382	1 227	1 607	1 789	1 160
Uzbekistan	4 979	990	1 347	2 550	4 612	4 095	4 359	3 977	5 194	4 382	4 726	5 056	4 770	5 467	6 375	4 665	4 015	2 887	1 995	1 445	2 317	2 031	1 631	1 221
Jordan	4 779	3 416	3 063	4 998	5 322	5 264	5 269	4 664	5 187	4 188	4 099	3 876	3 868	4 282	3 936	3 917	4 038	3 748	3 431	2 927	3 964	4 572	3 900	3 269
Morocco	4 756	3 819	2 866	3 721	3 077	4 229	4 586	3 710	3 605	3 336	3 656	4 399	5 013	5 447	4 425	4 513	4 949	4 411	4 128	3 137	3 387	4 958	3614	2 970
Israel	3 439	3 103	3 687	4 304	3 706	3 802	4 142	3 965	3 805	3 996	4 153	3 826	4 515	5 612	5 851	4 496	5 943	5 755	4 160	2 741	3 826	3 744	2 783	1 847
Lebanon	3 434	2 253	2 120	2 605	2 581	2 818	2 971	2 813	3 245	2 783	2 879	3 295	3 487	3 831	4 254	4 267	4 083	4 282	3 818	2 956	3 935	4 579	3 662	3 033
Syria	3 248	1 748	3 176	5 967	14 686	5 877	4 800	3 840	3 540	3 366	3 014	2 785	2 555	2 442	2 641	2 385	2 918	2 831	2 256	1 938	2 557	3 350	2 367	2 048
Algeria	3 125	1 898	1 581	2 299	2 123	2 139	2 180	1 775	1 669	1 241	1 369	1 364	1 305	1 485	1 037	1 036	1 300	1 115	805	759	1 030	875	906	789
Armenia	3 037	1 833	2 145	3 101	3 217	3 437	3 543	2 962	2 913	2 722	2 681	2 983	2 979	3 442	3 586	4 351	6 317	2 591	1 833	1 287	1 800	1 762	1 253	1 250
Iraq	2 797	1 726	2 266	6 514	14 351	14 203	18 904	21 107	19 153	9 552	20 369	21 133	19 855	12 110	4 795	3 765	4 337	4 077	3 494	2 450	5 174	4 965	5 087	3 360
Saudi Arabia	2 764	1 780	1 854	2 514	2 100	2 135	2 117	1 744	1 696	1 463	1 343	1 396	1 263	1 418	1 194	1 171	1 542	1 210	906	735	1 014	1 178	1 063	759
Georgia	2 303	1 239	1 179	1 691	1 643	1 629	1 635	1 410	1 240	1 368	1 341	1 490	1 518	1 578	1 620	1 554	2 003	1 389	964	735	886	786	493	310
United Arab Emirates	1 960	1 332	1 251	1 586	1 379	1 314	1 370	1 193	1 039	910	854	707	779	697	693	758	1 006	812	596	380	472	461	436	310
Kazakhstan	1 787	1 330	1 307	1 533	1 378	1 377	1 310	1 201	1 221	1 241	1 202	1 235	1 282	1 562	1 630	1 604	2 073	2 223	1 906	1 740	2 315	2 310	1 493	723
Kyrgyzstan	1 637	710	594	881	908	715	847	790	707	652	648	542	507	574										
Azerbaijan	1 129	545	814	1 169	1 015	881	784	676	672	637	663	728	781	834										
Kuwait	1 116	916	768	1 201	1 090	1 177	1 186	1 055	1 057	937	1 044	973	1 037	1 124	1 104	1 017	1 230	1 152	1 091	710	1 063	1 270	1 018	803
Tajikistan	951	538	523	1 158	893	652	593	595	516	550	411	382	299	265										
Turkmenistan	942	161	250	330	286	251	235	226	254	210	223													
Libya	709	409	514	511	499	780	642	734	524	376	315	357	355	296										
Tunisia	569	514	463	510	517	535	518	518	429	445	422	440	418	416										
Qatar	430	323	215	287	236	224	272	229	202	191	141													
Oman	210	154	118	148	110	104	116	85	90	73	74													
Bahrain	163	151	127	183	143	130	138	145	122	115	104													
Rest*	–	–	–	–	–	–	–	–	–	–	–	632	539	880	3 220	3 129	4 953	3 667	2 687	2 020	2 856	2 961	2 414	1 588

* Palestine

Southeast Asia:

Country	2022	2021	2020	2019	2018	2017	2016	2015	2014	2013	2012	2011	2010	2009	2008	2007	2006	2005	2004	2003	2002	2001	2000	1999
Total from Southeast Asia	76 274	56 130	69 886	104 848	104 517	118 192	125 225	116 041	106 527	111 306	121 834	127 193	120 840	125 338	108 833	127 579	139 130	114 659	105 582	78 819	100 170	104 349	81 664	59 967
Philippines	35 998	27 511	25 491	45 920	47 258	49 147	53 287	56 478	49 996	54 446	57 327	57 011	58 173	60 029	54 030	72 596	74 606	60 746	57 846	45 250	51 040	52 919	42 343	30 943
Vietnam	24 425	16 312	29 995	39 712	33 834	38 231	41 451	30 832	30 283	27 101	28 304	34 157	30 632	29 234	31 497	28 691	30 691	32 784	31 524	22 087	33 563	35 419	26 553	20 335
Thailand	4 632	4 037	4 177	5 551	5 556	6 311	7 039	7 502	6 197	7 583	9 459	9 962	9 384	10 444	6 637	8 751	11 749	5 505	4 318	3 126	4 144	4 245	3 753	2 366
Cambodia	3 400	1 762	1 593	2 748	3 187	4 056	3 173	1 868	2 536	2 624	2 473	2 745	2 986	3 771	3 713	4 246	5 773	4 022	3 553	2 263	2 800	2 462	2 138	1 394
Burma	2 879	2 143	4 000	5 024	8 182	12 897	13 065	12 808	11 144	12 565	17 383	16 518	12 925	13 621	3 403	3 130	4 562	2 095	1 379	1 193	1 356	1 373	1 201	1 200
Indonesia	1 752	1 588	1 428	1 899	1 756	1 914	2 129	2 084	2 139	2 731	2 603	2 856	3 032	3 679	3 606	3 716	4 868	3 924	2 419	1 805	2 418	2 525	1 767	1 186
Malaysia	1 573	1 605	1 898	2 303	3 051	4 109	3 382	2 749	2 622	2 477	2 605	2 273	1 714	2 014	1 945	2 149	2 281	2 632	1 987	1 200	2 124	2 439	1 551	991
Singapore	971	799	807	818	801	818	812	781	779	835	712	690	774	832										
Laos	621	349	486	850	863	685	856	917	806	923	949	956	1200	1688										
Brunei	23	24	11	23	29	24	31	21	25	21	19	25	20	26										
Rest*	–	–	–	–	–	–	–	–	–	–	–	–	–	–	4 002	4 300	4 600	2 951	2 556	1 895	2 725	2 967	2 358	1 552

* Timor-Leste

Europe:

Country	2022	2021	2020	2019	2018	2017	2016	2015	2014	2013	2012	2011	2010	2009	2008	2007	2006	2005	2004	2003	2002	2001	2000	1999
Total from Europe	75 671	61 508	68 984	87 585	80 024	84 327	93 556	83 630	83 259	86 675	81 775	83 736	88 732	105 528	103 853	106 625	146 359	165 076	124 928	94 018	164 443	165 712	124 598	87 815
Ukraine	11 621	7 578	9 886	11 762	11 879	10 135	10 422	7 987	7 752	8 193	7 642	8 292	8 477	11 223	10 813	11 001	17 140	22 745	14 156	11 633	21 190	20 914	15 511	10 102
United Kingdom	9 143	9 229	9 655	11 337	9 908	10 948	12 673	12 592	12 225	12 984	12 014	11 572	12 792	15 748	14 348	14 545	17 207	19 800	14 915	9 527	16 297	18 278	13 273	7 647
Russia	8 906	5 525	7 967	9 822	8 621	8 918	9 297	8 799	9 079	9 753	9 969	7 944	6 718	8 238	11 695	9 426	13 159	18 055	17 410	13 935	20 771	20 313	16 940	12 321
Albania	5 945	2 612	3 508	5 366	5 049	5 722	5 773	4 653	3 828	3 186	3 364	3 612	4 711	5 137	5 754	5 737	7 914	5 947	3 840	3 362	3 765	4 358	4 755	3 695
France	4 351	4 107	4 053	4 787	4 276	4 782	5 159	4 693	4 284	4 425	3 862	3 653	3 861	4 491	4 872	3 423	4 258	4 399	3 595	2 375	3 797	4 569	3 442	2 196
Germany	4 088	3 900	3 913	4 848	4 443	4 662	5 306	5 436	5 584	6 032	5 812	6 125	6 888	7 583	7 091	7 582	8 436	9 264	7 099	5 064	8 888	9 790	7 565	5 166
Italy	3 477	3 069	3 184	3 822	3 329	3 655	4 078	3 544	3 298	2 960	2 673	2 443	2 579	2 892	2 514	2 569	3 215	3 066	2 346	1 644	2 578	3 096	2 448	1 512
Poland	3 192	2 970	3 341	4 700	4 357	4 845	5 603	5 275	5 689	6 430	6 300	6 863	7 643	8 754	8 354	10 355	17 051	15 351	14 326	10 510	12 711	11 769	10 090	8773
Spain	2 865	2 644	2 620	3 115	2 841	3 045	3 519	3 303	2 928	2 480	1 842	1 890	1 684	1 769	1 621	1 578	1 971	1 888	1 339	917	1 361	1 711	1 254	869
Belarus	2 172	1 435	1 723	2 263	1 951	1 919	2 127	1 994	2 015	1 970	1 659	1 964	2 038	2 407	2 390	2 328	3 086	3 503	2 255	1 858	2 923	2 901	2 170	1 320
Romania	1 827	1 846	1 994	2 616	2 448	2 953	3 554	3 376	3 246	3 773	3 748	3 882	4 003	4 910	4 930	5 802	7 137	7 103	4 571	3 655	4 887	6 628	6 863	5 678
Moldova	1 499	1 052	1 367	1 935	2 206	2 480	2 929	2 496	2 341	2 485	2 021	2 258	1 981	2 295	1 692	1 356	3 036	3 506	1 507	1 151	2 103	2 068	1 251	753
Ireland	1 366	1 364	1 466	1 760	1 401	1 485	1 759	1 607	1 605	1 626	1 514	1 371	1 507	1 637	1 465	1 503	1 906	2 088	1 531	983	1 398	1 505	1 296	804
Soviet Union (former)	1 236	1 082	1 070	1 227	1 022	939	1 042	1 022	1 136	1 264	1 296	3 687	4 978	5 911	5 270	5 090	6 229	2 899	929	1 072	2 403	2 707	3 263	5 022
Bulgaria	1 151	1 000	1 118	1 759	1 798	2 184	2 670	2 688	2 981	2 844	2 440	2 661	2 570	3 133	2 960	3 981	4 828	5 635	4 253	3 825	3 608	4 400	4 917	4 171
North Macedonia	979	745	590	1 079	1 082	1 027	1 262	1 060	960	895	906	1 078	963	1 128										
Netherlands	972	1 009	962	1 274	998	1 056	1 319	1 309	1 195	1 142	1 091	1 085	1 321	1 499	1 240	1 368	1 651	1 815	1 303	981	1 549	1 679	1 337	773
Greece	918	842	945	1 350	1 214	1 314	1 451	1 211	1 235	1 361	1 054	949	745	798	769	882	1 124	1 070	769	651	1 009	1 155	950	719
Kosovo	853	562	678	1 020	886	1 014	1 020	814	758	839	782	670	355											
Hungary	840	730	761	1 070	917	972	1 048	1 095	996	1 052	1 054	1 044	1 022	1 314										
Sweden	751	788	835	1 018	889	950	1 144	1 066	954	1 106	968	979	1 097	1 138										
Portugal	746	750	679	940	889	939	1 006	857	892	918	811	821	755	946										
Serbia	636	810	1 077	1 532	1 217	1 410	1 351	1 278	1 143	866	704	244	20											
Switzerland	614	614	592	595	570	565	743	640	656	697	635	615	675	798										
Belgium	552	601	629	714	537	625	691	662	632	675	574	567	592	686										
Lithuania	506	487	475	750	658	645	735	750	747	854	924	936	985	1 069										
Bosnia and Herzegovina	506	478	477	637	682	846	971	859	693	697	815	878	946	1 501										
Czech Republic	474	496	454	714	534	582	650	637	606	676	677	303	190	146										
Austria	344	359	311	437	401	387	432	474	438	415	407	424	442	512										
Finland	288	324	317	497	442	439	489	407	350	331	348	363	397	423										
Rest*	2 853	2 500	2 337	2 839	2 568	2 884	3 333	1 046	3 013	3 620	3 762	4 462	5 675	6 120	18 345	18 631	26 835	36 204	28 083	21 418	53 047	47 655	27 113	16 188

* Croatia, Cyprus, Czechoslovakia (former), Denmark, Estonia, Iceland, Latvia, Luxembourg, Malta, Monaco, Montenegro, Norway, Serbia and Montenegro (former), Slovakia, Slovenia

Sub-Saharan Africa:

Country	2022	2021	2020	2019	2018	2017	2016	2015	2014	2013	2012	2011	2010	2009	2008	2007	2006	2005	2004	2003	2002	2001	2000	1999
Total from sub-Saharan Africa	72 062	55 097	64 938	94 472	99 500	101 143	93 326	82 458	80 623	82 609	92 478	86 028	85 282	110 551	91 041	79 283	99 879	70 936	55 315	40 896	50 127	42 070	35 072	28 086
Nigeria	12 385	13 100	12 398	15 888	13 952	13 539	14 380	11 542	12 828	13 840	13 575	11 824	13 376	15 253	12 475	12 448	13 459	10 597	9 374	7 872	8 105	8 253	7 831	6 742
Cameroon	5 879	3 578	2 842	4 369	4 236	4 668	4 899	4 374	3 943	3 908	3 815	4 754	4 161	3 463	3 771	3 392	2 919	1 458	1 309	927	984	791	860	824
Ethiopia	5 720	3 706	6 280	9 060	12 403	14 637	13 232	11 394	12 300	13 097	14 544	13 793	14 266	15 462	12 917	12 786	16 152	10 571	8 286	6 635	7 565	5 092	4 053	4 262
Ghana	5 451	3 939	4 627	8 526	8 394	8 455	6 949	6 186	7 115	10 265	10 592	8 798	7 429	8 401	8 195	7 610	9 367	6 491	5 337	4 410	4 248	4 023	4 339	3 707
Kenya	5 014	3 088	4 026	7 052	7 190	6 957	6 274	5 602	5 884	6 123	7 043	7 762	7 421	9 880	6 998	7 030	8 779	5 347	5 335	3 209	3 199	2 501	2 197	1 407
Democratic Republic of Congo	4 688	3 906	7 522	8 999	9 941	8 709	6 791	5 345	4 347	2 792	3 731	2 424	1 764	2 122	1 261	1 129	738	260	155	110	178	145	123	87
South Africa	3 535	2 716	2 733	3 174	3 010	2 912	3 023	2 907	2 676	2 629	2 781	2 649	2 758	3 171	2 723	2 988	3 201	4 536	3 370	2 210	3 861	4 090	2 824	1 577
Liberia	2 412	2 504	1 674	3 495	3 101	4 155	3 619	3 795	3 874	3 334	4 109	4 151	4 837	7 641	7 193	4 102	6 887	4 880	2 757	1 766	2 869	2 273	1 570	1 351
Sierra Leone	2 323	1 227	713	1 443	1 527	2 058	1 535	1 599	1 740	1 651	1 688	1 985	2 011	2 687	2 795	1 999	3 572	2 731	1 596	1 492	2 246	1 878	1 585	970
Togo	1 887	1 143	1 276	1 546	1 534	1 572	1 938	1 547	1 612	1 257	1 756	1 506	1 563	1 680	1 661	1 565	1 720	1 523	2 041	1 187	935	487	386	254
Eritrea	1 760	1 304	1 881	2 385	2 428	2 449	2 267	2 220	2 002	2 138	2 643	2 102	1 656	1 928	1 270	1 081	1 593	796	675	556	560	540	382	325
Tanzania	1 643	1 438	2 312	3 142	3 186	1 415	788	799	774	837	1 516	1 427	1 850	2 773	838									
Uganda	1 620	1 146	1 802	2 560	2 412	1 898	1 649	1 664	1 409	1 350	1 340	1 239	1 085	1 364	1 174	1 122	1 372	858	721	455	575	457	418	250
Côte d'Ivoire	1 559	1 207	1 049	1 589	1 375	1 810	1 617	1 497	1 477	1 486	1 760	1 302	1 621	2 159	1 645	1 193	2 067	930	666	483	629	596	439	303
Rwanda	1 540	784	1 084	1 509	1 620	1 394	1 357	732	555	540	592	520	489	952	378									
Zimbabwe	1 433	737	674	758	749	810	815	779	797	924	914	1 016	1 274	983										
Sudan	1 371	871	1 867	2 949	3 658	3 515	3 159	3 580	2 442	1 945	2 471	2 628	2 397	3 577	3 598	2 930	5 504	5 231	3 211	1 883	2 921	1 650	1 531	1 346
Guinea	1 365	745	858	1 579	1 282	1 348	1 501	1 389	1 375	1 518	1 656	1 555	1 379	1 725	1 735	1 088	1 110	495	347	29	16	11	5	3
Senegal	1 253	962	999	1 665	1 420	1 470	1 533	1 244	1 273	1 340	1 615	1 424	1 285	1 524	1 149	1 024	1 367	913	769	522	530	663	554	368
Cabo Verde	1 119	941	995	1 852	1 929	2 618	2 242	1 253	1 154	1 673	1 684	1 808	1 668	2 238	1 916	2 048	1 780	1 225	1 015	745	871	868	1 079	902
Somalia	1 042	961	2 024	3 752	7 557	7 404	6 958	6 796	5 190	3 764	5 204	4 451	4 558	13 390	10 745	6 251	9 462	5 829	3 929	2 444	4 535	3 007	2 393	1 690
Gambia	1 010	778	664	1 378	1 023	1 134	1 247	1 142	1 111	1 018	1 159	972	859	978	739	826	897	581	422	263	343	390	231	183
Burkina Faso	814	551	465	646	525	541	642	575	583	585	558	433	377	416										
Burundi	788	730	1 099	781	762	1 094	415	351	273	260	535	593	841	1 505	255									
Benin	721	467	450	619	573	648	577	466	517	342	415	462	486	401										
Republic of Congo	527	219	308	476	580	632	625	496	552	1 059	1 461	1 371	968	1 563										
Mali	481	378	389	586	488	544	598	587	604	667	734	629	528	576										
Zambia	365	361	401	511	477	537	487	460	441	505	643	652	628	704										
Rest*	2 357	1 610	1 526	2 183	2 168	2 540	2 214	2 101	1 775	1 927	1 798	1 747	2 034	5 610	6 671	7 933	5 684	4 000	3 698	4 957	4 355	2 274	1 533	

* Angola, Botswana, Central African Republic, Chad, Djibouti, Equatorial Guinea, Eswatini, Gabon, Guinea-Bissau, Lesotho, Madagascar, Malawi, Mauritania, Mauritius, Mozambique, Namibia, Niger, São Tomé and Príncipe, Seychelles, South Sudan

Oceania:

Country	2022	2021	2020	2019	2018	2017	2016	2015	2014	2013	2012	2011	2010	2009	2008	2007	2006	2005	2004	2003	2002	2001	2000	1999
Total from Oceania	5 105	4 131	3 980	5 340	4 653	5 049	5 577	5 385	5 098	5 265	4 728	4 962	5 337	5 563	5 254	6 090	7 372	6 526	5 967	4 335	5 482	6 052	5 089	3 636
Australia	2 859	2 682	2 523	3 205	2 693	2 906	3 239	3 034	2 809	2 759	2 414	2 343	2 512	2 622	2 464	2 518	3 249	3 193	2 604	1 836	2 557	2 811	2 044	1 103
Fiji	1 124	419	425	734	730	805	866	875	802	895	853	1 041	1 201	1 194										
New Zealand	650	665	607	844	719	798	846	855	796	921	814	803	919	947										
Rest*	472	365	425	557	511	540	626	621	691	690	647	775	705	800	2 790	3 572	4 123	3 333	3 363	2 499	2 925	3 241	3 045	2 533

* American Samoa, Federated States of Micronesia, French Polynesia, Kiribati, Marshall Islands, Nauru, New Caledonia, Palau, Papua New Guinea, Samoa, Solomon Islands, Tonga, Tuvalu, Vanuatu, Wallis and Futuna

== Total percentage of U.S. racial groups by U.S. region, state, and overall nationally ==
=== Non-Hispanic White population as a percentage of the total population by U.S. region and state (1940–2020) ===
State/Territory	1940	1950	1960	1970	1980	1990	2000	2010	2016	2018	2020
United States	88.4	87.5	85.4	83.2	79.6	75.6	69.1	63.7			
Northeast	95.7	-	-	86.9	83.4	79.4					
Midwest	96.1	-	-	90.0	87.5	85.8					
South	74.1	-	-	76.1	74.3	71.8					
West	90.0	-	-	79.6	73.5	66.7					
Alabama	65.3%	-	-	73.3%	73.3%	73.3%	70.3%	67.0%	65.8%	65.3%	63.1%
Alaska	48.3%	-	-	77.2%	75.8%	73.9%	67.6%	64.1%	61.2%	60.2%	57.5%
Arizona	65.1%	70.2%	74.9%	74.3%	74.5%	71.7%	63.8%	57.8%	55.5%	54.3%	53.4%
Arkansas	75.2%	-	-	81.0%	82.2%	82.2%	78.6%	74.5%	72.9%	72.1%	68.5%
California	89.5%	86.5%	82.9%	76.3%	66.6%	57.2%	46.7%	40.1%	37.7%	36.6%	34.7%
Colorado	90.3%	88.9%	88.0%	84.6%	82.7%	80.7%	74.5%	70.0%	68.6%	67.8%	65.1%
Connecticut	97.9%	-	-	91.4%	88.0%	83.8%	77.5%	71.2%	67.7%	66.3%	63.2%
Delaware	86.4%	-	-	84.1%	81.3%	79.3%	72.5%	65.3%	62.9%	61.9%	58.6%
(Washington, D.C.) District of Columbia	71.4%	-	-	26.5%	25.7%	27.4%	27.8%	34.8%	36.4%	37.0%	38.0%
Florida	71.5%	-	-	77.9%	76.7%	73.2%	65.4%	57.9%	54.9%	53.3%	51.5%
(Georgia (U.S. state)) Georgia	65.2%	-	-	73.4%	71.6%	70.1%	62.6%	55.9%	53.4%	52.2%	50.1%
Hawaii	24.5%	-	-	38.0%	31.1%	31.4%	22.9%	22.7%	22.1%	21.7%	21.6%
Idaho	98.4%	-	-	95.9%	93.9%	92.2%	88.0%	84.0%	82.4%	81.7%	78.9%
Illinois	94.7%	-	-	83.5%	78.0%	74.8%	67.8%	63.7%	61.7%	60.9%	58.3%
Indiana	96.3%	-	-	91.7%	90.2%	89.6%	85.8%	81.5%	79.6%	78.7%	75.5%
Iowa	99.2%	-	-	98.0%	96.9%	95.9%	92.6%	88.7%	86.2%	85.4%	82.7%
Kansas	95.6%	-	-	92.7%	90.5%	88.4%	83.1%	78.2%	76.3%	75.6%	72.2%
Kentucky	92.5%	-	-	92.4%	91.7%	91.7%	89.3%	86.3%	85.0%	84.5%	81.3%
Louisiana	63.7%	-	-	68.2%	67.6%	65.8%	62.5%	60.3%	59.0%	58.4%	55.8%
Maine	99.7%	-	-	99.1%	98.3%	98.0%	96.5%	94.4%	93.5%	93.1%	90.2%
Maryland	83.3%	-	-	80.4%	73.9%	69.6%	62.1%	54.7%	51.5%	50.2%	47.2%
Massachusetts	98.6%	-	-	95.4%	92.3%	87.8%	81.9%	76.1%	72.7%	70.8%	67.6%
Michigan	95.7%	-	-	87.1%	84.1%	82.3%	78.6%	76.6%	75.4%	74.8%	72.4%
Minnesota	99.0%	-	-	97.7%	96.1%	93.7%	88.2%	83.1%	80.6%	79.4%	76.3%
Mississippi	50.6%	-	-	62.6%	63.6%	63.1%	60.7%	58.0%	56.9%	56.4%	55.4%
Missouri	93.4%	-	-	88.6%	87.7%	86.9%	83.8%	81.0%	79.7%	79.3%	75.8%
Montana	96.2%	-	-	94.7%	93.4%	91.8%	89.5%	87.8%	86.5%	85.8%	83.1%
Nebraska	98.2%	-	-	95.2%	94.0%	92.5%	87.3%	82.1%	79.6%	78.5%	75.7%
Nevada	91.6%	-	-	86.7%	83.2%	78.7%	65.2%	54.1%	49.9%	48.5%	45.9%
New Hampshire	99.9%	-	-	99.1%	98.4%	97.3%	95.1%	92.3%	90.8%	89.8%	87.2%
New Jersey	94.3%	-	-	84.7%	79.1%	74.0%	66.0%	59.3%	55.8%	54.6%	51.9%
New Mexico	50.9%	56.0%	63.8%	53.8%	52.6%	50.4%	44.7%	40.5%	38.1%	36.9%	36.5%
(New York (state)) New York	94.6%	-	-	80.1%	75.0%	69.3%	62.0%	58.3%	55.8%	55.2%	52.5%
North Carolina	71.9%	-	-	76.5%	75.3%	75.0%	70.2%	65.3%	63.5%	62.7	60.5%
North Dakota	98.3%	-	-	96.9%	95.5%	94.2%	91.7%	88.9%	85.0%	83.8%	81.7%
Ohio	95.0%	-	-	89.8%	88.2%	87.1%	84.0%	81.1%	79.5%	78.6%	75.9%
Oklahoma	89.9%	-	-	88.1%	85.0%	81.0%	74.1%	68.7%	66.2%	65.1%	60.8%
Oregon	98.6%	-	-	95.8%	93.3%	90.8%	83.5%	78.5%	76.4%	75.1%	71.7%
Pennsylvania	95.1%	-	-	90.3%	89.1%	87.7%	84.1%	79.5%	77.0%	75.9	73.5%
Rhode Island	98.3%	-	-	96.1%	93.4%	89.3%	81.9%	76.4%	73.3%	71.4%	68.7%
South Carolina	57.1%	-	-	69.0%	68.3%	68.5%	66.1%	64.1%	63.9%	63.5%	62.1%
South Dakota	96.2%	-	-	94.6%	92.3%	91.2%	88.0%	84.7%	82.5%	81.3%	79.6%
Tennessee	82.5%	-	-	83.7%	83.1%	82.6%	79.2%	75.6%	74.2%	73.6%	70.9%
Texas	74.1%	73.8%	72.6%	69.6%	65.7%	60.6%	52.4%	45.3%	42.6%	41.4%	39.7%
Utah	98.2%	-	-	93.6%	92.4%	91.2%	85.3%	80.4%	78.8%	77.8%	75.4%
Vermont	99.7%	-	-	99.2%	98.5%	98.1%	96.2%	94.3%	93.1%	92.7%	89.1%
Virginia	75.3%	-	-	80.1%	78.2%	76.0%	70.2%	64.8%	62.4%	61.3%	58.6%
(Washington (state)) Washington	97.7%	-	-	93.6%	90.2%	86.7%	78.9%	72.5%	69.5%	67.8%	63.8%
West Virginia	93.7%	-	-	95.7%	95.6%	95.8%	94.6%	93.2%	92.3%	92.0%	89.1%
Wisconsin	99.2%	-	-	95.6%	93.6%	91.3%	87.3%	83.3%	81.7%	81.0%	78.6%
Wyoming	95.9%	-	-	92.1%	92.0%	91.0%	88.9%	85.9%	84.1%	83.9%	81.4%
Puerto Rico	-	-	-	-	-	-	0.9%	0.7%	0.6%	0.7%	-

=== Black population as a percentage of the total population by U.S. region and state (1790–2020) ===
Many Southern U.S. states historically had African Americans compose 35% or more of their total population(s), with three of them (Louisiana, Mississippi, and South Carolina) even having an African American majority at certain periods in their history. In contrast, the African American percentage of the total population in other parts of the U.S. (outside of the South) was historically almost always in the single digits (0.0% to 9.9%). Even after the Great Migration, no or almost no U.S. state outside of the Southern U.S. has ever had an African American percentage of its total population be greater than 16%. The Black proportion has declined since the 1990s due to gentrification and expanding opportunities, with many Blacks moving to Texas, Georgia, Florida, and Maryland and others migrating to jobs in states of the New South in a reverse of the Great Migration.

African American population distribution over time

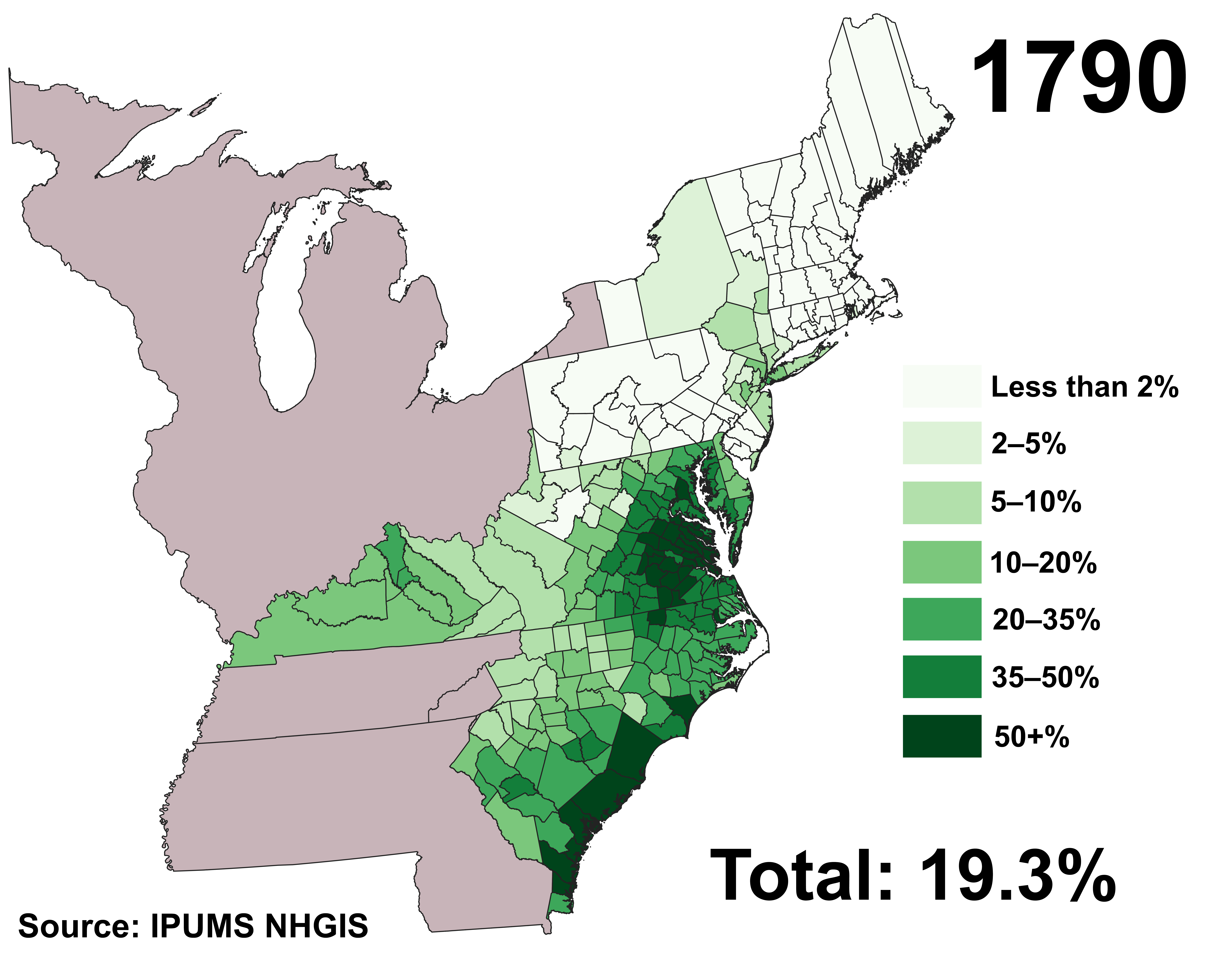
1790

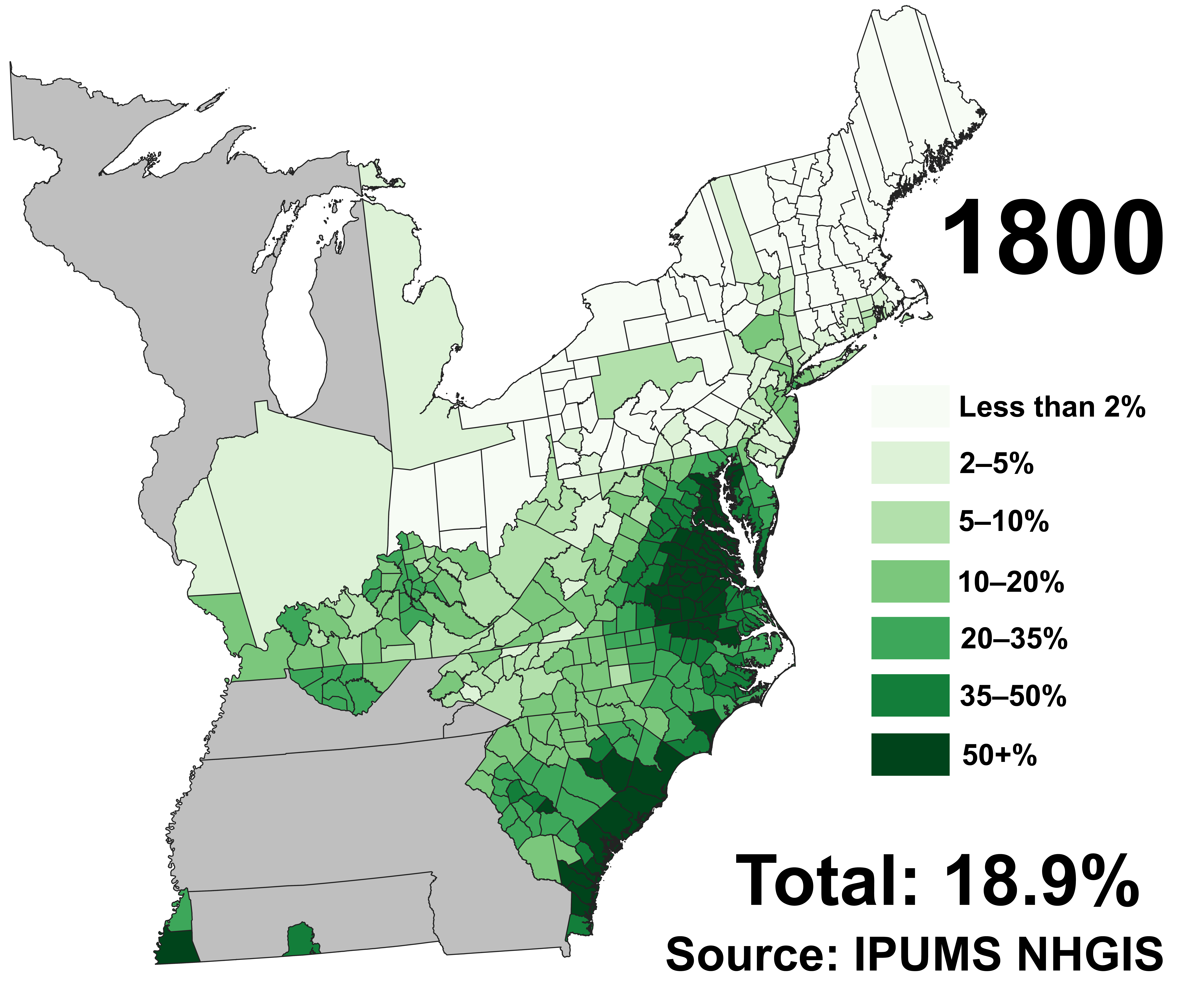
1800

1810

1820

1830

1840

1850

1860

1870

African Americans as percentage of total population (1790–2020) by U.S. state
State/territory	1790	1800	1810	1820	1830	1840	1850	1860	1870	1880	1890	1900	1910	1920	1930	1940	1950	1960	1970	1980	1990	2000	2010	2020
United States	19.3%	18.9%	19.0%	18.4%	18.1%	16.8%	15.7%	14.1%	12.7%	13.1%	11.9%	11.6%	10.7%	9.9%	9.7%	9.8%	10.0%	10.5%	11.1%	11.7%	12.1%	12.3%	12.6%	12.4%
Northeast	3.4%	3.2%	2.9%	2.5%	2.3%	2.1%	1.7%	1.5%	1.5%	1.6%	1.6%	1.8%	1.9%	2.3%	3.3%	3.8%	5.1%	6.8%	8.9%	9.9%	11.0%	11.4%	11.8%	11.5%
Midwest		1.2%	2.4%	2.1%	2.6%	2.7%	2.5%	2.0%	2.1%	2.2%	1.9%	1.9%	1.8%	2.3%	3.3%	3.5%	5.0%	6.7%	8.1%	9.1%	9.6%	10.1%	10.4%	10.4%
South	35.2%	35.0%	36.7%	37.2%	37.9%	38.0%	37.3%	36.8%	36.0%	36.0%	33.8%	32.3%	29.8%	26.9%	24.7%	23.8%	21.7%	20.6%	19.1%	18.6%	18.5%	18.9%	19.2%	18.6%
West							0.7%	0.7%	0.6%	0.7%	0.9%	0.7%	0.7%	0.9%	1.0%	1.2%	2.9%	3.9%	4.9%	5.2%	5.4%	4.9%	4.8%	4.6%
Alabama		41.4%	29.0%	33.2%	38.5%	43.3%	44.7%	45.4%	47.7%	47.5%	44.8%	45.2%	42.5%	38.4%	35.7%	34.7%	32.0%	30.0%	26.2%	25.6%	25.3%	26.0%	26.2%	25.8%
Alaska												0.3%	0.3%	0.2%	0.2%	0.2%		3.0%	3.0%	3.4%	4.1%	3.5%	3.3%	3.0%
Arizona								0.3%	0.3%	0.4%	1.5%	1.5%	1.0%	2.4%	2.5%	3.0%	3.5%	3.3%	3.0%	2.8%	3.0%	3.1%	4.1%	4.7%
Arkansas			13.0%	11.7%	15.5%	20.9%	22.7%	25.6%	25.2%	26.3%	27.4%	28.0%	28.1%	27.0%	25.8%	24.8%	22.3%	21.8%	18.3%	16.3%	15.9%	15.7%	15.4%	15.1%
California							1.0%	1.1%	0.8%	0.7%	0.9%	0.7%	0.9%	1.1%	1.4%	1.8%	4.4%	5.6%	7.0%	7.7%	7.4%	6.7%	6.2%	5.7%
Colorado								0.1%	1.1%	1.3%	1.5%	1.6%	1.4%	1.2%	1.1%	1.1%	1.5%	2.3%	3.0%	3.5%	4.0%	3.8%	4.0%	4.1%
Connecticut	2.3%	2.5%	2.6%	2.9%	2.7%	2.6%	2.1%	1.9%	1.8%	1.9%	1.6%	1.7%	1.4%	1.5%	1.8%	1.9%	2.7%	4.2%	6.0%	7.0%	8.3%	9.1%	10.1%	10.8%
Delaware	21.6%	22.4%	23.8%	24.0%	24.9%	25.0%	22.2%	19.3%	18.2%	18.0%	16.8%	16.6%	15.4%	13.6%	13.7%	13.5%	13.7%	13.6%	14.3%	16.1%	16.9%	19.2%	21.4%	22.1%
District of Columbia		30.4%	33.1%	31.2%	30.1%	29.1%	26.6%	19.1%	33.0%	33.6%	32.8%	31.1%	28.5%	25.1%	27.1%	28.2%	35.0%	53.9%	71.1%	70.3%	65.8%	60.0%	50.7%	41.4%
Florida					47.1%	48.7%	46.0%	44.6%	48.8%	47.0%	42.5%	43.7%	41.0%	34.0%	29.4%	27.1%	21.8%	17.8%	15.3%	13.8%	13.6%	14.6%	16.0%	15.1%
Georgia	35.9%	37.1%	42.5%	44.4%	42.6%	41.0%	42.4%	44.0%	46.0%	47.0%	46.7%	46.7%	45.1%	41.7%	36.8%	34.7%	30.9%	28.5%	25.9%	26.8%	27.0%	28.7%	30.5%	31.0%
Hawaii												0.2%	0.4%	0.1%	0.2%	0.1%	0.5%	0.8%	1.0%	1.8%	2.5%	1.8%	1.6%	1.6%
Idaho									0.4%	0.2%	0.2%	0.2%	0.2%	0.2%	0.2%	0.1%	0.2%	0.2%	0.3%	0.3%	0.3%	0.4%	0.6%	0.9%
Illinois		7.4%	6.4%	2.5%	1.5%	0.8%	0.6%	0.4%	1.1%	1.5%	1.5%	1.8%	1.9%	2.8%	4.3%	4.9%	7.4%	10.3%	12.8%	14.7%	14.8%	15.1%	14.5%	14.1%
Indiana		4.4%	2.6%	1.0%	1.1%	1.0%	1.1%	0.8%	1.5%	2.0%	2.1%	2.3%	2.2%	2.8%	3.5%	3.6%	4.4%	5.8%	6.9%	7.6%	7.8%	8.4%	9.1%	9.6%
Iowa						0.4%	0.2%	0.2%	0.5%	0.6%	0.6%	0.6%	0.7%	0.8%	0.7%	0.7%	0.8%	0.9%	1.2%	1.4%	1.7%	2.1%	2.9%	4.1%
Kansas								0.6%	4.7%	4.3%	3.5%	3.5%	3.2%	3.3%	3.5%	3.6%	3.8%	4.2%	4.8%	5.3%	5.8%	5.7%	5.9%	5.7%
Kentucky	17.0%	18.6%	20.2%	22.9%	24.7%	24.3%	22.5%	20.4%	16.8%	16.5%	14.4%	13.3%	11.4%	9.8%	8.6%	7.5%	6.9%	7.1%	7.2%	7.1%	7.1%	7.3%	7.8%	8.0%
Louisiana			55.2%	51.8%	58.5%	55.0%	50.7%	49.5%	50.1%	51.5%	50.0%	47.1%	43.1%	38.9%	36.9%	35.9%	32.9%	31.9%	29.8%	29.4%	30.8%	32.5%	32.0%	31.4%
Maine	0.6%	0.5%	0.4%	0.3%	0.3%	0.3%	0.2%	0.2%	0.3%	0.2%	0.2%	0.2%	0.2%	0.2%	0.1%	0.2%	0.1%	0.3%	0.3%	0.3%	0.4%	0.5%	1.2%	1.9%
Maryland	34.7%	36.7%	38.2%	36.1%	34.9%	32.3%	28.3%	24.9%	22.5%	22.5%	20.7%	19.8%	17.9%	16.9%	16.9%	16.6%	16.5%	16.7%	17.8%	22.7%	24.9%	27.9%	29.4%	29.5%
Massachusetts	1.4%	1.5%	1.4%	1.3%	1.2%	1.2%	0.9%	0.8%	1.0%	1.0%	1.0%	1.1%	1.1%	1.2%	1.2%	1.3%	1.6%	2.2%	3.1%	3.9%	5.0%	5.4%	6.6%	7.0%
Michigan		3.7%	3.0%	2.1%	0.8%	0.3%	0.6%	0.9%	1.0%	0.9%	0.7%	0.7%	0.6%	1.6%	3.5%	4.0%	6.9%	9.2%	11.2%	12.9%	13.9%	14.2%	14.2%	13.7%
Minnesota							0.6%	0.2%	0.2%	0.2%	0.3%	0.3%	0.3%	0.4%	0.4%	0.4%	0.5%	0.7%	0.9%	1.3%	2.2%	3.5%	5.2%	7.0%
Mississippi		41.5%	47.0%	44.1%	48.4%	52.3%	51.2%	55.3%	53.7%	57.5%	57.6%	58.5%	56.2%	52.2%	50.2%	49.2%	45.3%	42.0%	36.8%	35.2%	35.6%	36.3%	37.0%	36.6%
Missouri			17.6%	15.9%	18.3%	15.6%	13.2%	10.0%	6.9%	6.7%	5.6%	5.2%	4.8%	5.2%	6.2%	6.5%	7.5%	9.0%	10.3%	10.5%	10.7%	11.2%	11.6%	11.4%
Montana									0.9%	0.9%	1.0%	0.6%	0.2%	0.3%	0.2%	0.2%	0.2%	0.2%	0.3%	0.2%	0.3%	0.3%	0.4%	0.5%
Nebraska								0.3%	0.6%	0.5%	0.8%	0.6%	0.6%	1.0%	1.0%	1.1%	1.5%	2.1%	2.7%	3.1%	3.6%	4.0%	4.5%	4.9%
Nevada								0.7%	0.8%	0.8%	0.5%	0.3%	0.6%	0.4%	0.6%	0.6%	2.7%	4.7%	5.7%	6.4%	6.6%	6.8%	8.1%	9.8%
New Hampshire	0.6%	0.5%	0.5%	0.3%	0.2%	0.2%	0.2%	0.2%	0.2%	0.2%	0.2%	0.2%	0.1%	0.1%	0.2%	0.1%	0.1%	0.3%	0.3%	0.4%	0.6%	0.7%	1.1%	1.5%
New Jersey	7.7%	8.0%	7.6%	7.2%	6.4%	5.8%	4.9%	3.8%	3.4%	3.4%	3.3%	3.7%	3.5%	3.7%	5.2%	5.5%	6.6%	8.5%	10.7%	12.6%	13.4%	13.6%	13.7%	13.1%
New Mexico							0.0%	0.1%	0.2%	0.8%	1.2%	0.8%	0.5%	1.6%	0.7%	0.9%	1.2%	1.8%	1.9%	1.8%	2.0%	1.9%	2.1%	2.2%
New York	7.6%	5.3%	4.2%	2.9%	2.3%	2.1%	1.6%	1.3%	1.2%	1.3%	1.2%	1.4%	1.5%	1.9%	3.3%	4.2%	6.2%	8.4%	11.9%	13.7%	15.9%	15.9%	15.9%	14.8%
North Carolina	26.8%	29.4%	32.2%	34.4%	35.9%	35.6%	36.4%	36.4%	36.6%	38.0%	34.7%	33.0%	31.6%	29.8%	29.0%	27.5%	25.8%	24.5%	22.2%	22.4%	22.0%	21.6%	21.5%	20.5%
North Dakota									1.0%	0.3%	0.2%	0.1%	0.1%	0.1%	0.1%	0.0%	0.0%	0.1%	0.4%	0.4%	0.6%	0.6%	1.2%	3.4%
Ohio		0.5%	0.8%	0.8%	1.0%	1.1%	1.3%	1.6%	2.4%	2.5%	2.4%	2.3%	2.3%	3.2%	4.7%	4.9%	6.5%	8.1%	9.1%	10.0%	10.6%	11.5%	12.2%	12.5%
Oklahoma											8.4%	7.0%	8.3%	7.4%	7.2%	7.2%	6.5%	6.6%	6.7%	6.8%	7.4%	7.6%	7.4%	7.3%
Oregon							0.5%	0.2%	0.4%	0.3%	0.4%	0.3%	0.2%	0.3%	0.2%	0.2%	0.8%	1.0%	1.3%	1.4%	1.6%	1.6%	1.8%	2.0%
Pennsylvania	2.4%	2.7%	2.9%	2.9%	2.8%	2.8%	2.3%	2.0%	1.9%	2.0%	2.0%	2.5%	2.5%	3.3%	4.5%	4.7%	6.1%	7.5%	8.6%	8.8%	9.2%	10.0%	10.8%	10.9%
Rhode Island	6.3%	5.3%	4.8%	4.3%	3.7%	3.0%	2.5%	2.3%	2.3%	2.3%	2.1%	2.1%	1.8%	1.7%	1.4%	1.5%	1.8%	2.1%	2.7%	2.9%	3.9%	4.5%	5.7%	5.7%
South Carolina	43.7%	43.2%	48.4%	52.8%	55.6%	56.4%	58.9%	58.6%	58.9%	60.7%	59.8%	58.4%	55.2%	51.4%	45.6%	42.9%	38.8%	34.8%	30.5%	30.4%	29.8%	29.5%	27.9%	25.0%
South Dakota								0.0%	0.6%	0.3%	0.2%	0.1%	0.1%	0.1%	0.1%	0.1%	0.1%	0.2%	0.2%	0.3%	0.5%	0.6%	1.3%	2.0%
Tennessee	10.6%	13.2%	17.5%	19.6%	21.4%	22.7%	24.5%	25.5%	25.6%	26.1%	24.4%	23.8%	21.7%	19.3%	18.3%	17.4%	16.1%	16.5%	15.8%	15.8%	16.0%	16.4%	16.7%	15.8%
Texas							27.5%	30.3%	31.0%	24.7%	21.8%	20.4%	17.7%	15.9%	14.7%	14.4%	12.7%	12.4%	12.5%	12.0%	11.9%	11.5%	11.8%	12.2%
Utah							0.4%	0.1%	0.1%	0.2%	0.3%	0.2%	0.3%	0.3%	0.2%	0.2%	0.4%	0.5%	0.6%	0.6%	0.7%	0.8%	1.1%	1.2%
Vermont	0.3%	0.4%	0.3%	0.4%	0.3%	0.3%	0.2%	0.2%	0.3%	0.3%	0.3%	0.2%	0.5%	0.2%	0.2%	0.1%	0.1%	0.1%	0.2%	0.2%	0.3%	0.5%	1.0%	1.4%
Virginia	43.4%	44.6%	47.1%	47.8%	47.9%	46.9%	45.0%	43.3%	41.9%	41.8%	38.4%	35.6%	32.6%	29.9%	26.8%	24.7%	22.1%	20.6%	18.5%	18.9%	18.8%	19.6%	19.4%	18.6%
Washington							12.7%	0.3%	0.9%	0.4%	0.4%	0.5%	0.5%	0.5%	0.4%	0.4%	1.3%	1.7%	2.1%	2.6%	3.1%	3.2%	3.6%	4.0%
West Virginia	9.5%	9.8%	11.5%	12.1%	11.2%	9.6%	7.8%	5.6%	4.1%	4.2%	4.3%	4.5%	5.3%	5.9%	6.6%	6.2%	5.7%	4.8%	3.9%	3.3%	3.1%	3.2%	3.4%	3.7%
Wisconsin				1.2%	1.8%	0.6%	0.2%	0.2%	0.2%	0.2%	0.1%	0.1%	0.1%	0.2%	0.4%	0.4%	0.8%	1.9%	2.9%	3.9%	5.0%	5.7%	6.3%	6.4%
Wyoming									2.0%	1.4%	1.5%	1.0%	1.5%	0.7%	0.6%	0.4%	0.9%	0.7%	0.8%	0.7%	0.8%	0.8%	0.8%	0.9%
Puerto Rico																						8.0%	12.4%	7.0%

==== Free Blacks as a percentage out of the total Black population by U.S. region and U.S. state between 1790 and 1860 ====
In 1865, all enslaved Blacks (African Americans) in the United States were emancipated as a result of the Thirteenth Amendment. However, some U.S. states had previously emancipated some or all of their Black population. The table below shows the percentage of free Blacks as a percentage of the total Black population in various U.S. regions and U.S. states between 1790 and 1860 (the blank areas on the chart below mean that there is no data for those specific regions or states in those specific years).

Free Blacks as a percentage of the total Black (African American) population by U.S. region and U.S. state between 1790 and 1860
State/territory	1790	1800	1810	1820	1830	1840	1850	1860
United States	7.9%	10.8%	13.5%	13.2%	13.7%	13.4%	11.9%	11.0%
Northeast	40.1%	56.2%	73.5%	83.7%	97.8%	99.5%	99.8%	100.0%
Midwest		78.7%	52.4%	38.0%	37.7%	34.4%	35.5%	37.6%
South	4.7%	6.7%	8.5%	8.2%	8.4%	8.1%	7.0%	6.3%
West							97.9%	99.4%
Alabama		4.4%	2.2%	1.3%	1.3%	0.8%	0.7%	0.6%
Alaska								
Arizona								100.0%
Arkansas			1.4%	3.5%	3.0%	2.3%	1.3%	0.1%
California							100.0%	100.0%
Colorado								100.0%
Connecticut	50.4%	84.9%	95.4%	98.8%	99.7%	99.8%	100.0%	100.0%
Delaware	30.5%	57.3%	75.9%	74.2%	82.8%	86.7%	88.8%	91.7%
District of Columbia		16.2%	30.7%	37.9%	50.5%	66.2%	73.2%	77.8%
Florida					5.2%	3.1%	2.3%	1.5%
Georgia	1.3%	1.7%	1.7%	1.2%	1.1%	1.0%	0.8%	0.8%
Hawaii								
Idaho								
Illinois		41.5%	78.5%	33.3%	68.7%	91.6%	100.0%	100.0%
Indiana		75.7%	62.4%	86.6%	99.9%	100.0%	100.0%	100.0%
Iowa						91.5%	100.0%	100.0%
Kansas								99.7%
Kentucky	0.9%	1.8%	2.1%	2.1%	2.9%	3.9%	4.5%	4.5%
Louisiana			18.0%	13.2%	13.2%	13.1%	6.7%	5.3%
Maine	100.0%	100.0%	100.0%	100.0%	99.8%	100.0%	100.0%	100.0%
Maryland	7.2%	15.6%	23.3%	27.0%	33.9%	40.9%	45.3%	49.1%
Massachusetts	100.0%	100.0%	100.0%	100.0%	100.0%	100.0%	100.0%	100.0%
Michigan		100.0%	83.3%	100.0%	99.6%	100.0%	100.0%	100.0%
Minnesota							100.0%	100.0%
Mississippi		5.0%	1.2%	1.4%	0.8%	0.7%	0.3%	0.2%
Missouri			17.4%	3.3%	2.2%	2.6%	2.9%	3.0%
Montana								
Nebraska								81.7%
Nevada								100.0%
New Hampshire	79.9%	100.0%	100.0%	100.0%	99.5%	99.8%	100.0%	100.0%
New Jersey	19.5%	26.2%	42.0%	62.2%	89.0%	96.9%	99.0%	99.9%
New Mexico							100.0%	100.0%
New York	17.9%	33.3%	62.8%	74.4%	99.8%	100.0%	100.0%	100.0%
North Carolina	4.7%	5.0%	5.7%	6.7%	7.4%	8.5%	8.7%	8.4%
North Dakota								
Ohio		100.0%	100.0%	100.0%	99.9%	100.0%	100.0%	100.0%
Oklahoma								
Oregon							100.0%	100.0%
Pennsylvania	63.6%	89.5%	96.6%	99.3%	98.9%	99.9%	100.0%	100.0%
Rhode Island	78.2%	89.7%	97.1%	98.7%	99.5%	99.8%	100.0%	100.0%
South Carolina	1.7%	2.1%	2.3%	2.6%	2.4%	2.5%	2.3%	2.4%
South Dakota								N/A^{[a]}
Tennessee	9.6%	2.2%	2.9%	3.3%	3.1%	2.9%	2.6%	2.6%
Texas							0.7%	0.2%
Utah							48.0%	50.8%
Vermont	100.0%	100.0%	100.0%	100.0%	100.0%	100.0%	100.0%	100.0%
Virginia	4.1%	5.6%	7.3%	8.2%	9.3%	10.1%	10.2%	10.5%
Washington							100.0%	100.0%
West Virginia	11.6%	6.8%	10.5%	8.5%	10.9%	14.1%	13.1%	13.1%
Wisconsin				100.0%	51.6%	94.4%	100.0%	100.0%
Wyoming								

a There were no Blacks at all—either free or enslaved—in South Dakota in 1860.

=== Native American population as a percentage of the total population by U.S. region and state (1890–2020) ===
The census counted 248,000 Native Americans in 1890, 332,000 in 1930 and 334,000 in 1940, including those on and off reservations in the 48 states. Total spending on Native Americans averaged $38 million a year in the late 1920s, dropping to a low of $23 million in 1933, and returning to $38 million in 1940.

American Indian, Inuit, and Aleut % of population by U.S. state (1890–2010)
State/Territory	1890	1900	1910	1920	1930	1940	1950	1960	1970	1980	1990	2000	2010	2020
United States	0.4%	0.3%	0.3%	0.2%	0.3%	0.3%	0.2%	0.3%	0.4%	0.6%	0.8%	0.9%	0.9%	1.1%
Alabama	0.1%	0.0%	0.0%	0.0%	0.0%	0.0%	0.0%	0.0%	0.1%	0.2%	0.4%	0.5%	0.6%	0.7%
Alaska										16.0%	15.6%	15.6%	14.8%	15.2%
Arizona	34.0%	21.5%	14.3%	9.9%	10.0%	11.0%	8.8%	6.4%	5.4%	5.6%	5.6%	5.0%	4.6%	4.5%
Arkansas	0.0%	0.0%	0.0%	0.0%	0.0%	0.0%	0.0%	0.0%	0.1%	0.4%	0.5%	0.7%	0.8%	0.9%
California	1.4%	1.0%	0.7%	0.5%	0.3%	0.3%	0.2%	0.2%	0.5%	0.9%	0.8%	1.0%	1.0%	1.6%
Colorado	0.3%	0.3%	0.2%	0.1%	0.1%	0.1%	0.1%	0.2%	0.4%	0.6%	0.8%	1.0%	1.1%	1.3%
Connecticut	0.0%	0.0%	0.0%	0.0%	0.0%	0.0%	0.0%	0.0%	0.1%	0.1%	0.2%	0.3%	0.3%	0.4%
Delaware	0.0%	0.0%	0.0%	0.0%	0.0%	0.0%	0.0%	0.1%	0.1%	0.2%	0.3%	0.3%	0.5%	0.5%
District of Columbia	0.0%	0.0%	0.0%	0.0%	0.0%	0.0%	0.0%	0.1%	0.1%	0.2%	0.2%	0.3%	0.3%	0.5%
Florida	0.0%	0.1%	0.0%	0.1%	0.0%	0.0%	0.0%	0.1%	0.1%	0.2%	0.3%	0.3%	0.4%	0.4%
Georgia	0.0%	0.0%	0.0%	0.0%	0.0%	0.0%	0.0%	0.0%	0.1%	0.1%	0.2%	0.3%	0.3%	0.5%
Hawaii								0.1%	0.1%	0.3%	0.5%	0.3%	0.3%	0.3%
Idaho	4.8%	2.6%	1.1%	0.7%	0.8%	0.7%	0.6%	0.8%	0.9%	1.1%	1.4%	1.4%	1.4%	1.4%
Illinois	0.0%	0.0%	0.0%	0.0%	0.0%	0.0%	0.0%	0.0%	0.1%	0.1%	0.2%	0.2%	0.3%	0.8%
Indiana	0.0%	0.0%	0.0%	0.0%	0.0%	0.0%	0.0%	0.0%	0.1%	0.1%	0.2%	0.3%	0.3%	0.4%
Iowa	0.0%	0.0%	0.0%	0.0%	0.0%	0.0%	0.0%	0.1%	0.1%	0.2%	0.3%	0.3%	0.4%	0.5%
Kansas	0.1%	0.1%	0.1%	0.1%	0.1%	0.1%	0.1%	0.2%	0.4%	0.7%	0.9%	0.9%	1.0%	1.1%
Kentucky	0.0%	0.0%	0.0%	0.0%	0.0%	0.0%	0.0%	0.0%	0.0%	0.1%	0.2%	0.2%	0.2%	0.3%
Louisiana	0.1%	0.0%	0.0%	0.1%	0.1%	0.1%	0.0%	0.1%	0.1%	0.3%	0.4%	0.6%	0.7%	0.7%
Maine	0.1%	0.1%	0.1%	0.1%	0.1%	0.1%	0.2%	0.2%	0.2%	0.4%	0.5%	0.6%	0.6%	0.6%
Maryland	0.0%	0.0%	0.0%	0.0%	0.0%	0.0%	0.0%	0.0%	0.1%	0.2%	0.3%	0.3%	0.4%	0.5%
Massachusetts	0.0%	0.0%	0.0%	0.0%	0.0%	0.0%	0.0%	0.0%	0.1%	0.1%	0.2%	0.2%	0.3%	0.3%
Michigan	0.3%	0.3%	0.3%	0.2%	0.1%	0.1%	0.1%	0.1%	0.2%	0.4%	0.6%	0.6%	0.6%	0.6%
Minnesota	0.8%	0.5%	0.4%	0.4%	0.4%	0.4%	0.4%	0.5%	0.6%	0.9%	1.1%	1.1%	1.1%	1.2%
Mississippi	0.2%	0.1%	0.1%	0.1%	0.1%	0.1%	0.1%	0.1%	0.2%	0.2%	0.3%	0.4%	0.5%	0.6%
Missouri	0.0%	0.0%	0.0%	0.0%	0.0%	0.0%	0.0%	0.0%	0.1%	0.3%	0.4%	0.4%	0.5%	0.5%
Montana	7.8%	4.7%	0.8%	2.0%	2.8%	3.0%	2.8%	3.1%	3.9%	4.7%	6.0%	6.2%	6.3%	6.2%
Nebraska	0.6%	0.3%	0.3%	0.2%	0.2%	0.3%	0.3%	0.4%	0.4%	0.6%	0.8%	0.9%	1.2%	1.2%
Nevada	10.9%	12.3%	6.4%	6.3%	5.3%	4.3%	3.1%	2.3%	1.6%	1.7%	1.6%	1.3%	1.2%	1.4%
New Hampshire	0.0%	0.0%	0.0%	0.0%	0.0%	0.0%	0.0%	0.0%	0.0%	0.1%	0.2%	0.2%	0.2%	0.2%
New Jersey	0.0%	0.0%	0.0%	0.0%	0.0%	0.0%	0.0%	0.0%	0.1%	0.1%	0.2%	0.2%	0.3%	0.6%
New Mexico	9.4%	6.7%	6.3%	5.4%	6.8%	6.5%	6.2%	5.9%	7.2%	8.1%	8.9%	9.5%	9.4%	10.0%
New York	0.1%	0.1%	0.1%	0.1%	0.1%	0.1%	0.1%	0.1%	0.2%	0.2%	0.3%	0.4%	0.6%	0.7%
North Carolina	0.1%	0.3%	0.4%	0.5%	0.5%	0.6%	0.1%	0.8%	0.9%	1.1%	1.2%	1.2%	1.3%	1.2%
North Dakota	4.3%	2.2%	1.1%	1.0%	1.2%	1.6%	1.7%	1.9%	2.3%	3.1%	4.1%	4.9%	5.4%	5.0%
Ohio	0.0%	0.0%	0.0%	0.0%	0.0%	0.0%	0.0%	0.0%	0.1%	0.1%	0.2%	0.2%	0.2%	0.3%
Oklahoma	24.9%	8.2%	4.5%	2.8%	3.9%	2.7%	2.4%	2.8%	3.8%	5.6%	8.0%	7.9%	8.6%	8.4%
Oregon	1.6%	1.2%	0.8%	0.6%	0.5%	0.4%	0.4%	0.5%	0.6%	1.0%	1.4%	1.3%	1.4%	1.5%
Pennsylvania	0.0%	0.0%	0.0%	0.0%	0.0%	0.0%	0.0%	0.0%	0.0%	0.1%	0.1%	0.1%	0.2%	0.2%
Rhode Island	0.1%	0.0%	0.1%	0.0%	0.0%	0.0%	0.0%	0.1%	0.1%	0.3%	0.4%	0.5%	0.6%	0.7%
South Carolina	0.0%	0.0%	0.0%	0.0%	0.1%	0.1%			0.1%	0.2%	0.2%	0.3%	0.4%	0.5%
South Dakota	5.7%	5.0%	3.3%	2.6%	3.2%	3.6%	3.6%	3.8%	4.9%	6.5%	7.3%	8.3%	8.8%	8.8%
Tennessee	0.0%	0.0%	0.0%	0.0%	0.0%	0.0%	0.0%	0.0%	0.1%	0.1%	0.2%	0.3%	0.3%	0.4%
Texas	0.0%	0.0%	0.0%	0.0%	0.0%	0.0%	0.0%	0.1%	0.2%	0.3%	0.4%	0.6%	0.7%	1.0%
Utah	1.6%	0.9%	0.8%	0.6%	0.6%	0.7%	0.6%	0.8%	1.1%	1.3%	1.4%	1.3%	1.2%	1.3%
Vermont	0.0%	0.0%	0.0%	0.0%	0.0%	0.0%	0.0%	0.0%	0.1%	0.2%	0.3%	0.4%	0.4%	0.4%
Virginia	0.0%	0.0%	0.0%	0.0%	0.0%	0.0%	0.0%	0.1%	0.1%	0.2%	0.2%	0.3%	0.4%	0.5%
Washington	3.1%	1.9%	1.0%	0.7%	0.7%	0.7%	0.6%	0.7%	1.0%	1.5%	1.7%	1.6%	1.5%	1.6%
West Virginia	0.0%	0.0%	0.0%	0.0%	0.0%	0.0%	0.0%	0.0%	0.0%	0.1%	0.1%	0.2%	0.2%	0.2%
Wisconsin	0.6%	0.4%	0.4%	0.4%	0.4%	0.4%	0.4%	0.4%	0.4%	0.6%	0.8%	0.9%	1.0%	1.0%
Wyoming	2.9%	1.8%	1.0%	0.7%	0.8%	0.9%	1.1%	1.2%	1.5%	1.5%	2.1%	2.3%	2.4%	2.4%
Puerto Rico												0.4%	0.5%	0.5%

=== Mexican (1910–1930) and Hispanic/Latino (1940–2020) population as a percentage of the total population by U.S. region and state ===
Historically, the U.S. states with the largest Mexican/Hispanic/Latino populations were primarily located in the Southwestern states, Texas, and Florida. However, the percentage of the Hispanic/Latino population has dramatically increased in many U.S. states both inside and outside the Southwest in recent decades.

Percentage of population of Mexican origin (1910–1930) and of Hispanic/Latino origin (1940–2020) by U.S. state^{[a]}
State/territory	1910	1920	1930	1940	1950	1960	1970	1980	1990	2000	2010	2020
United States of America	0.4%	0.7%	1.2%	1.4%			4.7%	6.4%	9.0%	12.5%	16.3%	18.7%
Northeast	0.0%	0.0%	0.0%	0.4%			4.1%	5.3%	7.4%	9.8%	12.6%	15.2%
Midwest	0.0%	0.1%	0.3%	0.2%			1.5%	2.2%	2.9%	4.9%	7.0%	8.6%
South	1.1%	1.7%	2.5%	1.9%			4.4%	5.9%	7.9%	11.6%	15.9%	18.7%
West	1.9%	3.1%	5.4%	6.1%			11.3%	14.5%	19.1%	24.3%	28.6%	30.0%
Alabama	0.0%	0.0%	0.0%	0.0%			0.4%	0.9%	0.6%	1.7%	3.9%	5.3%
Alaska							2.1%	2.4%	3.2%	4.1%	5.5%	6.8%
Arizona	28.6%	30.4%	30.2%	20.4%	17.2%	14.9%	17.3%	16.2%	18.8%	25.3%	29.6%	30.7%
Arkansas	0.0%	0.0%	0.0%	0.0%			0.5%	0.8%	0.8%	3.2%	6.4%	8.5%
California	2.1%	3.7%	6.8%	6.0%	7.2%	9.1%	13.7%	19.2%	25.8%	32.4%	37.6%	39.4%
Colorado	0.4%	1.6%	5.7%	8.2%	9.0%	9.0%	11.6%	11.8%	12.9%	17.1%	20.7%	21.9%
Connecticut	0.0%	0.0%	0.0%	0.1%			2.4%	4.0%	6.5%	9.4%	13.4%	17.3%
Delaware	0.0%	0.0%	0.0%	0.1%			1.1%	1.6%	2.4%	4.8%	8.2%	10.5%
District of Columbia	0.0%	0.0%	0.0%	0.1%			2.1%	2.8%	5.4%	7.9%	9.1%	11.3%
Florida	0.0%	0.0%	0.0%	1.3%			6.6%	8.8%	12.2%	16.8%	22.5%	26.5%
Georgia	0.0%	0.0%	0.0%	0.0%			0.6%	1.1%	1.7%	5.3%	8.8%	10.5%
Hawaii							3.0%	7.4%	7.3%	7.2%	8.9%	9.5%
Idaho	0.0%	0.3%	0.3%	0.5%			2.6%	3.9%	5.3%	7.9%	11.2%	13.0%
Illinois	0.0%	0.1%	0.4%	0.3%			3.3%	5.6%	7.9%	12.3%	15.8%	18.2%
Indiana	0.0%	0.0%	0.3%	0.2%			1.3%	1.6%	1.8%	3.5%	6.0%	8.2%
Iowa	0.0%	0.1%	0.2%	0.1%			0.6%	0.9%	1.2%	2.8%	5.0%	6.8%
Kansas	0.5%	0.9%	1.1%	0.7%			2.1%	2.7%	3.8%	7.0%	10.5%	13.0%
Kentucky	0.0%	0.0%	0.0%	0.0%			0.3%	0.7%	0.6%	1.5%	3.1%	4.6%
Louisiana	0.1%	0.2%	0.3%	0.2%			1.9%	2.4%	2.2%	2.4%	4.2%	6.9%
Maine	0.0%	0.0%	0.0%	0.0%			0.4%	0.4%	0.6%	0.7%	1.3%	2.0%
Maryland	0.0%	0.0%	0.0%	0.0%			1.4%	1.5%	2.6%	4.3%	8.2%	11.8%
Massachusetts	0.0%	0.0%	0.0%	0.1%			1.1%	2.5%	4.8%	6.8%	9.6%	12.6%
Michigan	0.0%	0.0%	0.3%	0.2%			1.4%	1.8%	2.2%	3.3%	4.4%	5.6%
Minnesota	0.0%	0.0%	0.1%	0.1%			0.6%	0.8%	1.2%	2.9%	4.7%	6.1%
Mississippi	0.0%	0.0%	0.1%	0.0%			0.4%	1.0%	0.6%	1.4%	2.7%	3.6%
Missouri	0.0%	0.1%	0.1%	0.1%			0.9%	1.1%	1.2%	2.1%	3.5%	4.9%
Montana	0.0%	0.1%	0.5%	0.4%			1.1%	1.3%	1.5%	2.0%	2.9%	4.2%
Nebraska	0.0%	0.2%	0.5%	0.4%			1.4%	1.8%	2.3%	5.5%	9.2%	12.0%
Nevada	1.1%	1.8%	3.7%	2.8%			5.6%	6.7%	10.4%	19.7%	26.5%	28.7%
New Hampshire	0.0%	0.0%	0.0%	0.0%			0.4%	0.6%	1.0%	1.7%	2.8%	4.3%
New Jersey	0.0%	0.0%	0.0%	0.2%			4.3%	6.7%	9.6%	13.3%	17.7%	21.6%
New Mexico	6.9%	9.8%	15.2%	41.7%	36.5%	28.3%	37.4%	36.6%	38.2%	42.1%	46.3%	47.7%
New York	0.0%	0.0%	0.0%	1.0%			8.0%	9.5%	12.3%	15.1%	17.6%	19.5%
North Carolina	0.0%	0.0%	0.0%	0.0%			0.4%	1.0%	1.2%	4.7%	8.4%	10.7%
North Dakota	0.0%	0.0%	0.1%	0.0%			0.3%	0.6%	0.7%	1.2%	2.0%	4.3%
Ohio	0.0%	0.0%	0.1%	0.1%			0.9%	1.1%	1.3%	1.9%	3.1%	4.4%
Oklahoma	0.3%	0.4%	0.2%	0.2%			1.4%	1.9%	2.7%	5.2%	8.9%	11.9%
Oregon	0.0%	0.1%	0.2%	0.1%			1.7%	2.5%	4.0%	8.0%	11.7%	13.9%
Pennsylvania	0.0%	0.0%	0.0%	0.1%			0.9%	1.3%	2.0%	3.2%	5.7%	8.1%
Rhode Island	0.0%	0.0%	0.0%	0.1%			0.7%	2.1%	4.6%	8.7%	12.4%	16.6%
South Carolina	0.0%	0.0%	0.0%	0.0%			0.4%	1.1%	0.9%	2.4%	5.1%	6.9%
South Dakota	0.0%	0.0%	0.1%	0.0%			0.4%	0.6%	0.8%	1.4%	2.7%	4.4%
Tennessee	0.0%	0.0%	0.0%	0.0%			0.4%	0.7%	0.7%	2.2%	4.6%	6.9%
Texas	7.1%	9.9%	13.8%	11.5%	13.3%	14.8%	17.7%	21.0%	25.5%	32.0%	37.6%	39.3%
Utah	0.0%	0.3%	0.8%	0.5%			4.1%	4.1%	4.9%	9.0%	13.0%	15.1%
Vermont	0.0%	0.0%	0.0%	0.2%			0.6%	0.6%	0.7%	0.9%	1.5%	2.4%
Virginia	0.0%	0.0%	0.0%	0.0%			1.0%	1.5%	2.6%	4.7%	7.9%	10.5%
Washington	0.0%	0.0%	0.0%	0.1%			2.1%	2.9%	4.4%	7.5%	11.2%	13.7%
West Virginia	0.0%	0.0%	0.0%	0.1%			0.4%	0.7%	0.5%	0.7%	1.2%	1.9%
Wisconsin	0.0%	0.0%	0.1%	0.1%			0.9%	1.3%	1.9%	3.6%	5.9%	7.6%
Wyoming	0.2%	1.1%	3.2%	2.4%			5.6%	5.2%	5.7%	6.4%	8.9%	10.2%
Puerto Rico										98.8%	99.0%	98.9%

aThere are other estimates on this page which are a little different. These estimates here come from the U.S. Census Bureau.

=== Asian and Pacific Islander population by U.S. region and state (1860–2020) ===
Asian and Pacific Islander % of population by U.S. state (1860–2020)^{[a]}
State/Territory	1860	1870	1880	1890	1900	1910	1920	1930	1940	1950	1960	1970	1980	1990	2000	2010	2020
United States of America	0.1%	0.2%	0.2%	0.2%	0.2%	0.2%	0.2%	0.2%	0.2%	0.2%	0.5%	0.8%	1.5%	2.9%	3.7%	4.8%	6.2%
Alabama	0.0%	0.0%	0.0%	0.0%	0.0%	0.0%	0.0%	0.0%	0.0%	0.0%	0.0%	0.1%	0.2%	0.5%	0.7%	1.1%	1.6%
Alaska				7.1%	5.3%	3.8%	0.8%	0.8%	1.0%		0.8%	0.9%	2.0%	3.6%	4.5%	5.4%	7.7%
Arizona	0.0%	0.2%	4.0%	1.3%	1.4%	0.8%	0.5%	0.6%	0.5%	0.4%	0.4%	0.5%	0.8%	1.5%	1.9%	2.8%	3.8%
Arkansas	0.0%	0.0%	0.0%	0.0%	0.0%	0.0%	0.0%	0.0%	0.0%	0.0%	0.1%	0.1%	0.3%	0.5%	0.9%	1.2%	2.2%
California	9.2%	8.8%	8.7%	6.1%	3.8%	3.4%	3.1%	3.0%	2.4%	1.7%	2.0%	2.8%	5.3%	9.6%	11.2%	13.0%	15.8%
Colorado	0.0%	0.0%	0.3%	0.3%	0.1%	0.3%	0.3%	0.4%	0.3%	0.5%	0.5%	0.5%	1.0%	1.8%	2.3%	2.8%	3.7%
Connecticut	0.0%	0.0%	0.0%	0.0%	0.1%	0.0%	0.1%	0.0%	0.0%	0.1%	0.1%	0.2%	0.6%	1.5%	2.4%	3.8%	4.8%
Delaware	0.0%	0.0%	0.0%	0.0%	0.0%	0.0%	0.0%	0.0%	0.0%	0.0%	0.1%	0.3%	0.7%	1.4%	2.1%	3.2%	4.3%
(Washington, D.C.) District of Columbia	0.0%	0.0%	0.0%	0.0%	0.2%	0.1%	0.2%	0.2%	0.2%	0.4%	0.6%	0.7%	1.0%	1.8%	2.8%	3.5%	5.0%
Florida	0.0%	0.0%	0.0%	0.0%	0.0%	0.0%	0.0%	0.0%	0.0%	0.0%	0.1%	0.2%	0.6%	1.2%	1.8%	2.4%	3.1%
(Georgia (U.S. state)) Georgia	0.0%	0.0%	0.0%	0.0%	0.0%	0.0%	0.0%	0.0%	0.0%	0.0%	0.1%	0.1%	0.4%	1.2%	2.2%	3.2%	4.6%
Hawaii					80.9%	76.5%	78.4%	78.0%	73.3%	72.9%	65.3%	57.7%	60.5%	61.8%	51.0%	48.6%	48.0%
Idaho		28.5%	10.4%	2.4%	1.7%	0.7%	0.5%	0.4%	0.3%	0.4%	0.4%	0.5%	0.6%	0.9%	1.0%	1.2%	1.7%
Illinois	0.0%	0.0%	0.0%	0.0%	0.0%	0.0%	0.1%	0.1%	0.1%	0.2%	0.2%	0.4%	1.4%	2.5%	3.4%	4.6%	5.9%
Indiana	0.0%	0.0%	0.0%	0.0%	0.0%	0.0%	0.0%	0.0%	0.0%	0.0%	0.1%	0.1%	0.4%	0.7%	1.0%	1.6%	2.5%
Iowa	0.0%	0.0%	0.0%	0.0%	0.0%	0.0%	0.0%	0.0%	0.0%	0.0%	0.0%	0.1%	0.4%	0.9%	1.3%	1.7%	2.6%
Kansas	0.0%	0.0%	0.0%	0.0%	0.0%	0.0%	0.0%	0.0%	0.0%	0.0%	0.1%	0.2%	0.6%	1.3%	1.7%	2.4%	3.0%
Kentucky	0.0%	0.0%	0.0%	0.0%	0.0%	0.0%	0.0%	0.0%	0.0%	0.0%	0.0%	0.1%	0.3%	0.5%	0.7%	1.1%	1.8%
Louisiana	0.0%	0.0%	0.1%	0.0%	0.0%	0.0%	0.0%	0.0%	0.0%	0.0%	0.1%	0.1%	0.6%	1.0%	1.2%	1.5%	1.9%
Maine	0.0%	0.0%	0.0%	0.0%	0.0%	0.0%	0.0%	0.0%	0.0%	0.0%	0.1%	0.1%	0.3%	0.5%	0.7%	1.0%	1.2%
Maryland	0.0%	0.0%	0.0%	0.0%	0.0%	0.0%	0.0%	0.1%	0.0%	0.1%	0.2%	0.5%	1.5%	2.9%	4.0%	5.5%	6.9%
Massachusetts	0.0%	0.0%	0.0%	0.0%	0.1%	0.1%	0.1%	0.1%	0.1%	0.1%	0.2%	0.4%	0.9%	2.4%	3.8%	5.3%	7.2%
Michigan	0.0%	0.0%	0.0%	0.0%	0.0%	0.0%	0.0%	0.0%	0.0%	0.1%	0.1%	0.2%	0.6%	1.1%	1.8%	2.4%	3.3%
Minnesota	0.0%	0.0%	0.0%	0.0%	0.0%	0.0%	0.0%	0.0%	0.0%	0.1%	0.1%	0.2%	0.7%	1.8%	2.9%	4.0%	5.3%
Mississippi	0.0%	0.0%	0.0%	0.0%	0.0%	0.0%	0.0%	0.0%	0.0%	0.1%	0.1%	0.1%	0.3%	0.5%	0.7%	0.9%	1.1%
Missouri	0.0%	0.0%	0.0%	0.0%	0.0%	0.0%	0.0%	0.0%	0.0%	0.0%	0.1%	0.2%	0.5%	0.8%	1.2%	1.6%	2.4%
Montana		9.5%	4.5%	1.8%	1.7%	0.6%	0.4%	0.3%	0.2%	0.2%	0.2%	0.2%	0.3%	0.5%	0.6%	0.6%	0.9%
Nebraska	0.0%	0.0%	0.0%	0.0%	0.0%	0.1%	0.1%	0.1%	0.0%	0.1%	0.1%	0.2%	0.4%	0.8%	1.3%	1.8%	2.8%
Nevada	0.0%	7.3%	8.7%	6.0%	3.7%	2.3%	1.9%	1.3%	0.7%	0.5%	0.5%	0.7%	1.8%	3.2%	4.9%	7.2%	9.6%
New Hampshire	0.0%	0.0%	0.0%	0.0%	0.0%	0.0%	0.0%	0.0%	0.0%	0.0%	0.1%	0.2%	0.3%	0.8%	1.3%	2.2%	2.6%
New Jersey	0.0%	0.0%	0.0%	0.0%	0.1%	0.1%	0.1%	0.1%	0.0%	0.1%	0.1%	0.3%	1.4%	3.5%	5.7%	8.3%	10.2%
New Mexico	0.0%	0.0%	0.0%	0.2%	0.2%	0.2%	0.1%	0.1%	0.1%	0.1%	0.2%	0.2%	0.5%	0.9%	1.2%	1.4%	1.9%
(New York (state)) New York	0.0%	0.0%	0.0%	0.1%	0.1%	0.1%	0.1%	0.1%	0.1%	0.2%	0.3%	0.7%	1.8%	3.9%	5.5%	7.3%	9.7%
North Carolina	0.0%	0.0%	0.0%	0.0%	0.0%	0.0%	0.0%	0.0%	0.0%	0.0%	0.0%	0.1%	0.4%	0.8%	1.4%	2.2%	3.4%
North Dakota		0.0%	0.0%	0.0%	0.1%	0.0%	0.0%	0.0%	0.0%	0.0%	0.0%	0.1%	0.3%	0.5%	0.6%	1.0%	1.8%
Ohio	0.0%	0.0%	0.0%	0.0%	0.0%	0.0%	0.0%	0.0%	0.0%	0.0%	0.1%	0.2%	0.4%	0.8%	1.2%	1.7%	2.5%
Oklahoma				0.0%	0.0%	0.0%	0.0%	0.0%	0.0%	0.0%	0.1%	0.1%	0.6%	1.1%	1.5%	1.7%	2.5%
Oregon	0.0%	3.7%	5.4%	3.0%	3.1%	1.6%	1.0%	0.9%	0.6%	0.4%	0.5%	0.7%	1.3%	2.4%	3.2%	3.7%	5.1%
Pennsylvania	0.0%	0.0%	0.0%	0.0%	0.0%	0.0%	0.0%	0.0%	0.0%	0.0%	0.1%	0.2%	0.5%	1.2%	1.8%	2.7%	3.9%
Rhode Island	0.0%	0.0%	0.0%	0.0%	0.1%	0.1%	0.0%	0.0%	0.0%	0.1%	0.1%	0.4%	0.6%	1.8%	2.4%	2.9%	3.6%
South Carolina	0.0%	0.0%	0.0%	0.0%	0.0%	0.0%	0.0%	0.0%	0.0%	0.0%	0.0%	0.1%	0.4%	0.6%	0.9%	1.3%	1.9%
South Dakota	0.0%	0.0%	0.2%	0.1%	0.0%	0.0%	0.0%	0.0%	0.0%	0.0%	0.0%	0.1%	0.3%	0.4%	0.6%	0.9%	1.9%
Tennessee	0.0%	0.0%	0.0%	0.0%	0.0%	0.0%	0.0%	0.0%	0.0%	0.0%	0.0%	0.1%	0.3%	0.7%	1.0%	1.4%	2.1%
Texas	0.0%	0.0%	0.0%	0.0%	0.0%	0.0%	0.0%	0.0%	0.0%	0.1%	0.1%	0.2%	0.8%	1.9%	2.8%	3.8%	5.5%
Utah	0.0%	0.5%	0.3%	0.4%	0.4%	0.7%	0.7%	0.8%	0.5%	0.7%	0.6%	0.6%	1.0%	1.9%	2.4%	2.0%	3.6%
Vermont	0.0%	0.0%	0.0%	0.0%	0.0%	0.0%	0.0%	0.0%	0.0%	0.0%	0.0%	0.1%	0.3%	0.6%	0.9%	1.3%	1.8%
Virginia	0.0%	0.0%	0.0%	0.0%	0.0%	0.0%	0.0%	0.0%	0.0%	0.0%	0.1%	0.3%	1.2%	2.6%	3.8%	5.5%	7.2%
(Washington (state)) Washington	0.0%	1.0%	4.2%	1.0%	1.8%	1.4%	1.5%	1.5%	1.1%	0.7%	1.0%	1.3%	2.5%	4.3%	5.9%	7.2%	10.3%
West Virginia	0.0%	0.0%	0.0%	0.0%	0.0%	0.0%	0.0%	0.0%	0.0%	0.0%	0.0%	0.1%	0.3%	0.4%	0.5%	0.7%	0.8%
Wisconsin	0.0%	0.0%	0.0%	0.0%	0.0%	0.0%	0.0%	0.0%	0.0%	0.0%	0.1%	0.2%	0.4%	1.1%	1.7%	2.3%	3.0%
Wyoming		1.6%	4.4%	0.7%	0.9%	1.3%	0.8%	0.5%	0.3%	0.2%	0.2%	0.3%	0.4%	0.6%	0.7%	0.8%	1.0%
Puerto Rico															0.2%	0.2%	0.1%

== Projections from 2020 through to 2060 ==
The U.S. Census Bureau has projected that the U.S. White non-Hispanic population will become a minority (that is, less than half of the total U.S. population) during the 2040s, resulting in a plurality. In December 2012, the U.S. Census Bureau projected that 2043 would be the year in which the U.S. would become a majority minority nation, with no single ethnic classification constituting a majority of the population. By 2060, Hispanic Americans are projected to account for about one-third of the total U.S. population. The tables present Census Bureau "middle series" projections published in May 2013.

Racial and ethnic demographics of the United States (total numbers) between 2020 and 2060 (projected)
Race/ethnic group	2020	2030	2040	2050	2060
Total population	333,896,000	358,471,000	380,016,000	399,803,000	420,268,000
White	255,346,000	267,604,000	276,438,000	282,959,000	289,587,000
Black	44,810,000	49,246,000	53,412,000	57,553,000	61,822,000
American Indian, Eskimo, and Aleut	4,328,000	4,889,000	5,407,000	5,881,000	6,308,000
Asian and Pacific Islander	19,708,000	23,802,000	27,945,000	31,967,000	35,815,000
Two or more races	9,704,000	12,929,000	16,814,000	21,443,000	26,737,000
Hispanic (of any race)	63,784,000	78,655,000	94,876,000	111,732,000	128,780,000
Non-Hispanic White	199,313,000	198,817,000	193,887,000	186,334,000	178,951,000

Racial and Ethnic Demographics of the United States (Percentages) Between 2020 and 2060 (Projected)
Race/Ethnic Group	2020	2030	2040	2050	2060
White	76.5%	74.7%	72.7%	70.8%	68.9%
Black	13.4%	13.7%	14.1%	14.4%	14.7%
American Indian, Eskimo, and Aleut	1.3%	1.4%	1.4%	1.5%	1.5%
Asian and Pacific Islander	5.9%	6.6%	7.4%	8.0%	8.5%
Two or more races	2.9%	3.6%	4.4%	5.4%	6.4%
Hispanic (of any race)	19.1%	21.9%	25.0%	27.9%	30.6%
Non-Hispanic White	59.7%	55.5%	51.0%	46.6%	42.6%

== Vital statistics of racial and ethnic groups (since 1935) ==
	Average population (x 1,000)	Live births	Deaths	Natural change	Crude birth rate (per 1,000)	Crude death rate (per 1,000)	Natural change (per 1,000)	Total fertility rate
1935	127,362	2,377,000	1,392,752	984,248	18.7	10.9	7.7	2.19
1936	128,181	2,355,000	1,479,228	875,772	18.4	11.5	6.8	2.15
1937	128,961	2,413,000	1,450,427	962,573	18.7	11.2	7.5	2.17
1938	129,969	2,496,000	1,381,391	1,114,609	19.2	10.6	8.6	2.22
1939	131,028	2,466,000	1,387,897	1,078,103	18.8	10.6	8.2	2.17
1940	132,165	2,559,000	1,417,269	1,142,000	19.4	10.8	8.6	2.23
1941	133,002	2,703,000	1,397,642	1,305,358	20.3	10.5	9.8	2.33
1942	134,464	2,989,000	1,385,187	1,603,813	22.2	10.3	11.9	2.55
1943	136,003	3,104,000	1,459,544	1,644,306	22.8	10.7	12.1	2.64
1944	138,083	2,939,000	1,411,338	1,644,456	21.2	10.2	11.0	2.49
1945	139,994	2,858,000	1,401,719	1,456,281	20.4	10.0	10.4	2.42
1946	140,008	3,411,000	1,395,617	2,015,383	24.1	10.0	14.1	2.86
1947	145,023	3,817,000	1,445,370	2,371,630	26.6	10.0	16.6	3.18
1948	148,013	3,637,000	1,444,337	2,192,663	24.9	9.8	15.1	3.03
1949	149,336	3,649,000	1,443,607	2,205,393	24.5	9.7	14.8	3.04
1950	151,861	3,632,000	1,452,454	2,180,000	24.1	9.6	14.5	3.03
1951	154,056	3,823,000	1,482,099	2,340,901	24.8	9.6	15.2	3.20
1952	156,431	3,913,000	1,496,838	2,416,162	25.0	9.6	15.4	3.30
1953	159,047	3,965,000	1,447,459	2,142,000	25.2	9.1	16.1	3.36
1954	161,948	4,078,000	1,481,091	2,596,909	24.8	9.3	15.5	3.48
1955	163,476	4,097,000	1,528,717	2,568,283	25.0	9.3	14.3	3.52
1956	166,578	4,218,000	1,564,476	2,653,524	25.1	9.3	15.8	3.63
1957	169,637	4,308,000	1,633,128	2,666,872	25.3	9.5	15.8	3.71
1958	172,668	4,255,000	1,647,886	2,607,114	24.4	9.5	14.9	3.65
1959	175,642	4,244,796	1,656,814	2,587,982	24.0	9.4	14.7	3.66
1960	179,979	4,257,850	1,711,982	2,545,868	23.7	9.5	14.1	3.65
1961	182,992	4,268,326	1,701,522	2,566,804	23.3	9.3	14.0	3.62
1962	185,771	4,167,362	1,756,720	2,410,642	22.4	9.5	12.9	3.46
1963	188,483	4,098,020	1,813,549	2,284,471	21.7	9.6	12.1	3.32
1964	191,141	4,027,490	1,798,051	2,229,439	21.1	9.4	11.7	3.19
1965	193,526	3,760,358	1,828,136	1,932,222	19.4	9.5	9.9	2.91
1966	195,576	3,606,274	1,863,149	1,743,125	18.4	9.5	8.9	2.72
1967	197,457	3,520,959	1,851,323	1,669,636	17.8	9.4	8.4	2.56
1968	199,399	3,501,564	1,930,082	1,571,482	17.6	9.7	7.9	2.46
1969	201,385	3,600,206	1,921,990	1,678,216	17.9	9.5	8.4	2.46
1970	203,984	3,731,386	1,921,031	1,810,355	18.4	9.4	9.0	2.48
1971	206,827	3,555,970	1,927,542	1,628,428	17.2	9.3	7.9	2.27
1972	209,284	3,258,411	1,963,944	1,294,467	15.6	9.4	6.2	2.01
1973	211,357	3,136,965	1,973,003	1,163,962	14.8	9.5	5.3	1.88
1974	213,342	3,159,958	1,934,388	1,225,570	14.8	9.1	5.7	1.83
1975	215,465	3,144,198	1,892,879	1,251,319	14.6	8.8	5.8	1.77
1976	217,563	3,167,788	1,909,440	1,258,348	14.6	8.8	5.8	1.74
1977	219,760	3,326,632	1,899,597	1,427,035	15.1	8.6	6.5	1.79
1978	222,095	3,333,279	1,927,788	1,405,491	15.0	8.7	6.3	1.76
1979	224,567	3,494,398	1,913,841	1,580,557	15.6	8.5	7.1	1.81
1980	227,225	3,612,258	1,989,841	1,622,417	15.9	8.8	7.1	1.84
1981	229,466	3,629,238	1,977,981	1,651,257	15.8	8.6	7.2	1.81
1982	231,664	3,680,537	1,974,797	1,705,740	15.9	8.5	7.4	1.83
1983	233,792	3,638,933	2,019,201	1,619,732	15.6	8.6	6.9	1.80
1984	235,825	3,669,141	2,039,369	1,629,772	15.6	8.6	6.9	1.81
1985	237,924	3,760,561	2,086,440	1,674,121	15.8	8.8	7.0	1.84
1986	240,133	3,756,547	2,105,361	1,651,186	15.6	8.8	6.9	1.84
1987	242,289	3,809,394	2,123,323	1,686,071	15.7	8.8	7.0	1.87
1988	244,499	3,909,510	2,167,999	1,741,511	16.0	8.9	7.1	1.93
1989	246,819	4,040,958	2,150,466	1,890,492	16.4	8.7	7.7	2.01
1990	249,623	4,158,212	2,148,463	2,009,749	16.7	8.6	8.1	2.08
1991	252,981	4,110,907	2,169,518	1,941,389	16.2	8.6	7.7	2.06
1992	256,514	4,065,014	2,175,613	1,889,401	15.8	8.5	7.4	2.05
1993	259,919	4,000,240	2,268,553	1,731,687	15.4	8.7	6.7	2.02
1994	263,126	3,952,767	2,278,994	1,673,773	15.0	8.7	6.4	2.00
1995	266,278	3,899,589	2,312,132	1,587,457	14.6	8.7	6.0	1.98
1996	269,394	3,891,494	2,314,690	1,576,804	14.4	8.6	5.9	1.98
1997	272,647	3,880,894	2,314,245	1,566,649	14.2	8.5	5.7	1.97
1998	275,854	3,941,553	2,337,256	1,604,297	14.3	8.5	5.8	2.00
1999	279,040	3,959,417	2,391,399	1,568,018	14.2	8.6	5.6	2.01
2000	282,172	4,058,814	2,403,351	1,655,463	14.4	8.5	5.9	2.06
2001	285,082	4,025,933	2,416,425	1,609,508	14.1	8.5	5.6	2.03
2002	287,804	4,021,726	2,443,387	1,578,339	14.0	8.5	5.5	2.02
2003	290,326	4,089,950	2,448,288	1,641,662	14.1	8.4	5.5	2.05
2004	293,046	4,112,052	2,397,615	1,714,437	14.0	8.2	5.9	2.05
2005	295,753	4,138,349	2,448,017	1,690,332	14.0	8.3	5.7	2.06
2006	298,593	4,265,555	2,426,264	1,839,291	14.3	8.1	6.2	2.11
2007	301,580	4,316,233	2,423,712	1,892,521	14.3	8.0	6.3	2.12
2008	304,375	4,247,694	2,471,984	1,775,710	14.0	8.1	5.9	2.07
2009	307,007	4,130,665	2,437,163	1,693,502	13.5	7.9	5.6	2.00
2010	309,330	3,999,386	2,468,435	1,530,951	13.0	8.0	5.0	1.93
2011	311,583	3,953,590	2,515,458	1,438,412	12.7	8.1	4.6	1.89
2012	313,874	3,952,841	2,543,279	1,409,562	12.6	8.1	4.5	1.88
2013	316,129	3,932,181	2,596,993	1,335,188	12.4	8.2	4.2	1.86
2014	319,113	3,988,076	2,626,418	1,361,658	12.5	8.2	4.3	1.86
2015	321,442	3,978,497	2,712,630	1,265,867	12.4	8.4	4.0	1.84
2016	323,100	3,945,875	2,744,248	1,201,167	12.2	8.5	3.7	1.82
2017	325,719	3,855,500	2,813,503	1,041,997	11.8	8.7	3.1	1.76
2018	326,687	3,791,712	2,839,205	952,507	11.6	8.7	2.9	1.73
2019	328,240	3,747,540	2,854,838	892,682	11.4	8.7	2.7	1.70
2020	331,577	3,613,647	3,383,729	229,918	10.9	10.2	0.7	1.64
2021	332,100	3,664,292	3,464,231	200,061	11.0	10.4	0.6	1.66
2022	333,996	3,667,758	3,279,857	387,901	11.0	9.8	1.2	1.66
2023	336,755	3,596,017	3,090,964	505,053	10.7	9.2	1.5	1.62
2024	340,003	3,628,934	3,072,666	556,268	10.7	9.0	1.6	1.60
2025	341,784	3,606,407	3,094,593	511,814	10.6	9.1	1.5	1.58

Source: National Center for Health Statistics, Census Bureau Intercensal Estimates

=== White (including White Hispanic) ===
White Americans of one race (or alone) from 1960 to 2020

Average population and percentage of population figures shown are slightly higher than given Census Bureau data, due to the fact that the definition of "White" in this case includes, along with Non-Hispanic Whites and White Hispanics, Hispanics who identify as "Some Other Race", but are counted as White due to the option and category of "Some Other Race" alone often not being one in CDC demographic data.

	Average population (x 1,000)	Live births	Deaths	Natural change	Crude birth rate (per 1,000)	Crude death rate (per 1,000)	Natural change (per 1,000)	Fertility rates
1909	80,274	2,344,000			29.2			
1910	82,226	2,401,000			29.2			
1911	83,677	2,435,000			29.1			
1912	85,069	2,467,000			29.0			
1913	86,701	2,497,000			28.8			
1914	88,328	2,588,000			29.3			
1915	89,758	2,594,000			28.9			
1916	91,193	2,599,000			28.5			
1917	92,724	2,587,000			27.9			
1918	93,768	2,588,000			27.6			
1919	94,348	2,387,000			25.3			
1920	95,390	2,566,000			26.9			
1921	97,326	2,657,000			27.3			
1922	98,701	2,507,000			25.4			
1923	100,436	2,531,000			25.2			
1924	102,669	2,577,000			25.1			
1925	103,983	2,506,000			24.1			
1926	105,671	2,441,000			23.1			
1927	106,828	2,425,000			22.7			
1928	108,140	2,325,000			21.5			
1929	109,463	2,244,000			20.5			
1930	110,388	2,274,000			20.6			
1931	111,282	2,170,000			19.5			
1932	112,246	2,099,000			18.7			
1933	112,614	1,982,000			17.6			
1934	113,702	2,058,000			18.1			
1935	114,078	2,042,000			17.9			
1936	115,170	2,027,000			17.6			
1937	115,698	2,071,000			17.9			
1938	116,739	2,148,000			18.4			
1939	117,611	2,117,000			18.0			
1940	118,226	2,199,000			18.6			
1941	119,487	2,330,000			19.5			
1942	121,163	2,605,000			21.5			
1943	122,353	2,704,000			22.1			
1944	124,146	2,545,000			20.5			
1945	125,431	2,471,000			19.7			
1946	126,695	2,990,000			23.6			
1947	128,238	3,347,000			26.1			
1948	130,875	3,141,000			24.0			
1949	132,881	3,136,000			23.6			
1950	135,130	3,108,000			23.0			
1951	137,029	3,275,000			23.9			
1952	139,253	3,356,000			24.1			
1953	141,125	3,387,000			24.0			
1954	143,471	3,472,000			24.2			
1955	146,429	3,485,000			23.8			
1956	148,750	3,570,000			24.0			
1957	151,917	3,646,000			24.0			
1958	154,292	3,595,000			23.3			
1959	157,074	3,597,430			22.9			
1960	158,634	3,600,744			22.7			
1961	162,207	3,600,864			22.2			
1962	158,598	3,394,068			21.4			
1963	160,676	3,326,344			20.7			
1964	168,450	3,369,160			20.0			
1965	170,710	3,123,860			18.3			
1966	172,011	2,993,230			17.4			
1967	173,988	2,922,502			16.8			
1968	175,422	2,912,224			16.6			
1969	177,160	2,993,614			16.9			
1970	177,644	3,091,264			17.4			
1971	181,366	2,919,746			16.1			
1972	183,172	2,655,558			14.5			
1973	184,855	2,551,030			13.8			
1974	185,324	2,575,792			13.9			
1975	187,647	2,551,996			13.6			
1976	188,824	2,567,614			13.6			
1977	190,851	2,691,070			14.1			
1978	191,500	2,681,116			14.0			
1979	193,655	2,808,420			14.5			
1980	194,437	2,936,351			15.1			
1981	196,533	2,947,679			15.0			
1982	197,682	2,984,817			15.1			
1983	199,054	2,946,468			14.8			
1984	200,473	2,967,100			14.8			
1985	202,533	3,037,913			15.0			
1986	203,986	3,019,175			14.8			
1987	204,295	3,043,828			14.9			
1988	206,800	3,102,083			15.0			
1989	207,273	3,192,355			15.4			
1990	208,227 (83.4%)	3,290,273 (79.12%)	1,853,254	1,437,019	15.8	8.8	7.0	2.00
1991	211,830	3,241,273 (78.84%)	1,868,904	1,372,369	15.3	8.8	6.5	1.99
1992	213,467	3,201,678 (78.76%)	1,873,781	1,327,897	15.0	8.8	6.2	1.98
1993	215,753	3,149,833 (78.74%)	1,951,437	1,198,396	14.6	9.0	5.6	1.96
1994	218,252	3,121,004 (78.96%)	1,959,875	1,161,129	14.3	9.0	5.3	1.96
1995	219,787	3,098,885 (79.46%)	1,987,437	1,111,448	14.1	9.0	5.1	1.95
1996	222,518	3,093,057 (79.48%)	1,992,966	1,100,091	13.9	9.0	4.9	1.96
1997	224,307	3,072,640 (79.17%)	1,996,393	1,076,247	13.7	8.9	4.8	1.96
1998	226,014	3,118,727 (79.12%)	2,015,984	1,102,743	13.8	8.9	4.9	1.99
1999	228,686	3,132,501 (79.11%)	2,061,348	1,071,153	13.7	9.0	4.7	2.01
2000	229,784 (81.4%)	3,194,005 (78.69%)	2,071,287	1,122,718	13.9	9.0	4.9	2.05
2001	231,971	3,177,626 (78.92%)	2,079,691	1,097,935	13.7	8.9	4.8	2.04
2002	233,456	3,174,760 (78.94%)	2,102,589	1,072,171	13.6	9.0	4.6	2.04
2003	235,474	3,225,848 (78.87%)	2,103,714	1,122,134	13.7	8.9	4.8	2.07
2004	236,985	3,222,928 (78.38%)	2,056,643	1,166,285	13.6	8.7	4.9	2.07
2005	237,426	3,229,294 (78.03%)	2,098,097	1,131,197	13.6	8.8	4.8	2.08
2006	239,855	3,310,308 (77.60%)	2,077,549	1,232,759	13.8	8.7	5.1	2.12
2007	241,812	3,336,626 (77.30%)	2,074,151	1,262,475	13.8	8.6	5.2	2.14
2008	242,519	3,274,163 (77.08%)	2,120,233	1,153,930	13.5	8.7	4.8	2.09
2009	244,077	3,173,293 (76.82%)	2,086,355	1,086,938	13.0	8.5	4.5	2.02
2010	245,520 (79.4%)	3,069,315 (76.74%)	2,114,749	954,566	12.5	8.6	3.9	1.95
2011	247,540	3,020,355 (76.39%)	2,156,077	864,278	12.2	8.7	3.5	1.91
2012	247,934	2,999,820 (75.89%)	2,175,178	824,642	12.1	8.8	3.3	1.89
2013	248,833	2,985,757 (75.93%)	2,217,103	768,654	12.0	8.9	3.1	1.87
2014	251,667	3,019,863 (75.72%)	2,237,880	781,983	12.0	8.9	3.1	1.88
2015	251,071 (78.1%)	3,012,855 (75.73%)			12.0			1.86
2016		2,900,933 (73.52%)						1.77
2017		2,812,267 (72.94%)						1.76
2018		2,788,439 (73.54%)						1.75
2019		2,744,570 (73.23%)						
2020		2,647,430 (73.26%)						
2021		2,707,978 (73.90%)						
2022		2,705,157 (73.75%)						
2023		2,656,645 (73.89%)						

==== White (non-Hispanic) ====
The natural increase is slightly smaller than shown for non-Hispanic whites and slightly different for non-Hispanic blacks because the birth figures shown refer to mothers of that race, not the children. Most non-white babies of non-Hispanic white mothers are either Hispanic or black, and non-Hispanic black mothers occasionally have Hispanic children. On the other hand, all children born to Hispanic mothers, even if the mothers are white Hispanic, are counted as Hispanic.

	Average population (x 1,000)	Live births^{1}	Deaths	Natural change^{1}	Crude birth rate (per 1,000)	Crude death rate (per 1,000)	Natural change (per 1,000)	Fertility rates
1990^{2}	188,128 (75.6)	2,626,500 (63.16%)			14.4			1.85
1991^{2}		2,589,878 (63.00%)			13.9			1.82
1992^{2}		2,527,207 (62.17%)			13.4			1.80
1993		2,472,031 (61.80%)			13.1			1.79
1994		2,438,855 (61.70%)			12.8			1.78
1995		2,382,638 (61.10%)			12.5			1.78
1996		2,358,989 (60.62%)			12.3			1.78
1997		2,333,363 (60.12%)	1,895,461	437,902	12.2	9.7	2.5	1.79
1998		2,361,462 (59.91%)	1,912,802	448,660	12.2	9.7	2.5	1.82
1999		2,346,450 (59.26%)	1,953,197	393,253	12.1	9.9	2.2	1.84
2000	195,702 (69.3%)	2,362,968 (58.22%)	1,959,919	403,049	12.2	9.9	2.3	1.87
2001	195,975 (68.7%)	2,326,578 (57.79%)	1,962,810	363,768	11.9	9.9	2.0	1.85
2002	196,141 (68.1%)	2,298,156 (57.14%)	1,981,973	316,183	11.7	10.0	1.7	1.84
2003	196,233 (67.6%)	2,321,904 (56.77%)	1,979,465	342,439	11.8	10.0	1.8	1.87
2004	196,462 (67.0%)	2,296,683 (55.85%)	1,933,382	363,301	11.7	9.7	2.0	1.87
2005	196,621 (66.4%)	2,279,768 (55.09%)	1,967,142	312,626	11.6	9.9	1.7	1.87
2006	196,833 (65.9%)	2,308,640 (54.12%)	1,944,617	364,023	11.7	9.8	1.9	1.90
2007	197,011 (65.3%)	2,310,333 (53.53%)	1,939,606	370,727	11.7	9.7	2.0	1.91
2008	197,184 (64.8%)	2,267,817 (53.39%)	1,981,034	286,783	11.5	9.9	1.6	1.87
2009	197,275 (64.3%)	2,212,552 (53.56%)	1,944,606	267,946	11.2	9.7	1.5	1.83
2010	196,929 (63.7%)	2,162,406 (54.07%)	1,969,916	192,490	10.9	9.8	1.1	1.79
2011	197,085 (63.3%)	2,146,566 (54.29%)	2,006,319	140,247	10.8	10.0	0.8	1.77
2012	197,243 (62.8%)	2,134,044 (53.99%)	2,016,896	117,148	10.7	10.0	0.7	1.76
2013	197,392 (62.4%)	2,129,196 (54.15%)	2,052,660	76,536	10.7	10.2	0.5	1.75
2014	197,409 (61.9%)	2,149,302 (53.89%)	2,066,949	82,353	10.8	10.3	0.5	1.76
2015	197,534 (61.5%)	2,130,279 (53.59%)	2,123,631	6,648	10.7	10.6	0.1	1.75
2016	197,479 (61.1%)	2,056,332 (52.11%)	2,133,463	-77,131	10.5	10.6	-0.1	1.72
2017	197,285 (60.6%)	1,992,461 (51.68%)	2,179,857	-187,396	10.2	10.8	-0.7	1.67
2018	197,071 (60.3%)	1,956,413 (51.60%)	2,182,552	-226,139	10.0	10.9	-1.0	1.64
2019	196,705 (59.9%)	1,915,912 (51.12%)	2,183,844	-267,932	9.8	10.9	-1.1	1.61
2020	196,414 (59.3%)	1,843,432 (51.01%)	2,484,072	-640,640	9.4	12.6	-3.1	1.55
2021	195,790	1,887,656 (51.51%)	2,548,809	-661,153	9.7	13.0	-3.3	1.60
2022	195,128	1,840,739 (50.19%)	2,448,093	-607,354	9.5	12.6	-3.2	1.57
2023	194,516	1,787,051 (49.70%)	2,308,328	-521,277	9.3	11.9	-2.6	1.51
2024		1,783,156 (49.15%)	2,290,348	-507,192	9.2			1.53
2025		1,792,034 (50.19%)	2,301,212	-509,178				

=== Black or African American (non-Hispanic) ===
	Average population (x 1,000)	Live births^{1}	Deaths	Natural change^{1}	Crude birth rate (per 1,000)	Crude death rate (per 1,000)	Natural change (per 1,000)	Fertility rates
1990^{2}	29,986 (12.1)	661,701 (15.91%)			23.0			2.55
1991^{2}		666,758 (16.22%)			22.4			2.53
1992^{2}		657,450 (16.17%)			21.6			2.48
1993		641,273 (16.03%)			20.7			2.41
1994		619,198 (15.66%)			19.5			2.31
1995		587,781 (15.07%)			18.2			2.19
1996		578,099 (14.86%)			17.6			2.14
1997		581,431 (14.98%)	273,381	308,050	17.4	8.1	9.3	2.14
1998		593,127 (15.05%)	275,264	317,863	17.5	8.0	9.5	2.16
1999	34,722	588,981 (14.88%)	281,979	307,002	17.0	8.1	9.0	2.13
2000	35,092 (12.4%)	604,346 (14.89%)	282,676	321,670	17.2	8.1	9.3	2.18
2001	35,638	589,917 (14.65%)	284,343	305,574	16.6	8.0	8.6	2.11
2002	36,050	578,335 (14.38%)	286,573	291,762	16.0	7.9	8.2	2.05
2003	36,422	576,033 (14.08%)	287,968	288,065	15.8	7.9	8.0	2.04
2004	36,849	578,772 (14.08%)	283,859	294,913	15.7	7.7	8.1	2.03
2005	37,271	583,759 (14.11%)	289,163	294,596	15.7	7.8	8.1	2.03
2006	37,719	617,247 (14.47%)	286,581	330,666	16.4	7.6	8.9	2.13
2007	38,185	627,191 (14.53%)	286,366	340,825	16.4	7.5	9.1	2.14
2008	38,652	623,029 (14.67%)	285,522	337,507	16.1	7.4	8.9	2.12
2009	39,105	609,584 (14.76%)	282,982	326,602	15.6	7.2	8.5	2.05
2010	39,437 (12.3%)	589,808 (14.75%)	283,438	306,370	15.0	7.2	7.9	1.97
2011	39,945 (12.2%)	582,345 (14.73%)	286,797	295,548	14.6	7.2	7.5	1.92
2012	40,391 (12.3%)	583,489 (14.76%)	291,179	292,310	14.4	7.2	7.4	1.90
2013	40,802 (12.3%)	583,834 (14.85%)	299,227	284,607	14.3	7.3	7.1	1.88
2014	41,317 (12.3%)	588,891 (14.77%)	303,844	285,047	14.3	7.4	7.1	1.87
2015	41,777 (12.3%)	589,047 (14.86%)	315,254	273,793	14.1	7.6	6.7	1.86
2016	42,142 (12.3%)	558,622 (14.16%)	326,810	231,812	14.0	7.8	6.2	1.83
2017	42,624 (12.3%)	560,715 (14.54%)	335,667	225,048	13.9	7.9	6.0	1.82
2018	42,935	552,029 (14.56%)	341,408	210,621	13.6	8.0	5.6	1.79
2019	43,236	548,075 (14.62%)	346,677	201,398	13.4	8.1	5.3	1.78
2020	43,577	529,811 (14.66%)	449,213	80,598	12.8	10.2	2.6	1.71
2021	43,785	517,889 (14.13%)	449,764	68,125	12.5	10.3	2.2	1.68
2022	44,009	511,439 (13.94%)	411,934	99,505	12.3	9.4	2.9	1.65
2023	44,311	491,494 (13.66%)	385,399	106,095	11.7	8.7	3.0	1.56
2024		473,377 (13.04%)	380,945	92,432	11.1			1.50
2025		455,814 (12.77%)	382,579	73,235				

=== Asian (including of Hispanic origin) ===
	Average population (x 1,000)	Live births^{1}	Deaths	Natural change^{1}	Crude birth rate (per 1,000)	Crude death rate (per 1,000)	Natural change (per 1,000)	Fertility rates
1990		141,635 (3.41%)	21,127	120,508	19.0			2.00
1991		145,372 (3.54%)	22,173	123,199	18.3			1.93
1992		150,250 (3.70%)	23,660	126,590	17.9			1.90
1993		152,800 (3.82%)	25,386	127,414	17.3			1.84
1994		157,632 (3.99%)	27,103	130,529	17.1			1.83
1995		160,287 (4.11%)	28,297	131,990	16.7			1.80
1996		165,776 (4.26%)	29,508	136,268	16.5			1.79
1997		169,769 (4.37%)	30,756	139,013	16.2			1.76
1998		172,652 (4.38%)	31,987	140,665	15.9			1.73
1999		180,776 (4.57%)	33,675	147,101	15.9			1.75
2000	11,173 (4.0%)	200,543 (4.94%)	34,875	165,668	17.1			1.89
2001	11,670 (4.1%)	200,279 (4.97%)	37,048	163,231	16.1	3.0	13.1	1.79
2002	12,157 (4.2%)	210,907 (5.24%)	38,332	172,575	16.3	3.0	13.3	1.79
2003	12,626 (4.3%)	221,203 (5.41%)	40,127	181,076	16.4	3.0	13.4	1.82
2004	13,090 (4.5%)	229,123 (5.57%)	40,533	188,590	16.4	2.9	13.5	1.83
2005	13,576 (4.6%)	231,108 (5.58%)	43,194	187,914	15.9	3.0	12.9	1.78
2006	14,067 (4.7%)	241,045 (5.65%)	44,707	196,338	16.0	3.0	13.0	1.80
2007	14,548 (4.8%)	254,488 (5.90%)	45,609	208,879	16.4	2.9	13.5	1.85
2008	15,031 (4.9%)	253,185 (5.96%)	47,903	205,282	15.7	3.0	12.7	1.80
2009	15,492 (5.0%)	251,089 (6.08%)	49,225	201,864	15.1	3.0	12.1	1.74
2010	15,922 (5.1%)	246,886 (6.17%)	50,018	196,868	14.5	3.1	11.4	1.69
2011	16,270 (5.2%)	253,915 (6.42%)	52,346	201,479	14.5	3.2	11.3	1.71
2012		272,802 (6.90%)	55,298	217,504	15.1	3.2	11.9	1.77
2013		265,673 (6.76%)	58,702	206,971	14.3	3.3	11.0	1.68
2014		282,723 (7.09%)	60,424	222,299	14.6	3.3	11.3	1.72
2015		281,264 (7.12%)	65,277	215,987	14.0	3.4	10.6	1.65
2016	17,345 (5.4%)	254,471 (6.45%)	68,235	186,236	14.6	3.5	11.1	1.69
2017	18,000 (5.5%)	249,250 (6.46%)	72,598	176,652	13.8	3.6	10.2	1.60
2018	18,401 (5.6%)	240,798 (6.35%)	68,768	172,030	13.2	3.5	9.7	1.53
2019	18,798 (5.7%)	238,769 (6.37%)	70,532	168,237	13.0	3.5	9.5	1.51
2020	19,032 (5.7%)	219,068 (6.06%)	91,175	127,893	11.6	4.8	6.8	1.38
2021	19,285	213,813 (5.83%)	92,432	121,381	11.2	4.8	6.4	1.35
2022	19,657	218,994 (5.97%)	89,591	129,403	11.1	4.6	6.5	1.31
2023		215,738 (6.00%)	85,769	129,969	10.7			1.26
2024		226,860 (6.25%)	87,728	139,132	10.6			1.26
2025		221,916 (6.22%)	90,681	131,235				

* The data from 2016, exclude those of Hispanic origin, and also Native Hawaiians and other Pacific Islanders.

=== American Indian and Alaska Native (including of Hispanic origin) ===
	Average population (x 1,000)	Live births^{1}	Deaths	Natural change^{1}	Crude birth rate (per 1,000)	Crude death rate (per 1,000)	Natural change (per 1,000)	Fertility rates
1990		39,051 (0.94%)	8,316	30,735	18.9			2.19
1991		38,841 (0.94%)	8,621	30,220	18.3			2.14
1992		39,453 (0.97%)	8,953	30,500	17.9			2.14
1993		38,732 (0.97%)	9,579	29,153	17.0			2.01
1994		37,740 (0.95%)	9,637	28,103	16.0			1.95
1995		37,278 (0.96%)	9,997	27,281	15.3			1.88
1996		37,880 (0.97%)	10,127	27,753	14.9			1.86
1997		38,572 (0.99%)	10,576	27,996	14.7			1.83
1998		40,272 (1.02%)	10,845	29,427	14.8			1.85
1999		40,170 (1.01%)	11,312	28,858	14.2			1.78
2000	2,684 (1.0%)	41,668 (1.03%)	11,363	30,305	14.0	3.8	10.2	1.77
2001	2,770 (1.0%)	41,872 (1.04%)	11,977	29,895	13.6	3.9	9.7	1.72
2002	2,857 (1.0%)	42,368 (1.05%)	12,415	29,953	13.3	3.9	9.4	1.68
2003	2,948 (1.0%)	43,052 (1.05%)	13,147	29,905	13.0	4.0	9.0	1.64
2004	3,045 (1.0%)	43,927 (1.07%)	13,124	30,803	12.8	3.8	9.0	1.61
2005	3,148 (1.1%)	44,813 (1.08%)	13,918	30,895	12.6	3.9	8.7	1.59
2006	3,259 (1.1%)	47,721 (1.12%)	14,037	33,684	13.0	3.8	9.2	1.63
2007	3,377 (1.1%)	49,443 (1.15%)	14,367	35,076	12.9	3.8	9.1	1.63
2008	3,505 (1.2%)	49,537 (1.17%)	14,776	34,761	12.5	3.7	8.8	1.57
2009	3,637 (1.2%)	48,665 (1.18%)	14,960	33,705	11.8	3.6	8.2	1.50
2010	3,755 (1.2%)	46,760 (1.17%)	15,565	31,195	11.0	3.6	7.4	1.40
2011	3,815 (1.2%)	46,419 (1.17%)	15,945	30,474	10.7	3.7	7.0	1.37
2012		46,093 (1.17%)	16,527	29,566	10.5	3.8	6.7	1.35
2013		45,991 (1.17%)	17,052	28,939	10.3	3.8	6.5	1.33
2014		44,928 (1.13%)	18,008	26,920	9.9	4.0	5.9	1.29
2015	4,566 (1.4%)	44,299 (1.11%)	18,039	26,260	9.7			1.26
2016	2,126 (0.7%)	31,452 (0.80%)	18,595	12,857	13.3	6.9	6.4	1.79
2017	2,145 (0.7%)	29,957 (0.78%)	19,198	10,759	12.6	8.9	3.7	1.70
2018	2,157 (0.7%)	29,092 (0.77%)	19,491	9,673	12.2	9.0	3.2	1.65
2019	2,168 (0.7%)	28,450 (0.76%)	19,696	8,754	11.9			1.61
2020	2,174 (0.7%)	26,813 (0.74%)	26,755	58	11.1			1.52
2021		26,124 (0.71%)			10.8			1.48
2022		25,721 (0.70%)	23,613	1,658	10.8			1.44
2023		24,571 (0.68%)	21,274	3,297	10.3			1.38
2024		24,021 (0.66%)	20,924	3,097	10.0			1.38
2025		23,122 (0.65%)	20,918	2,204				

* The data from 2016, exclude those of Hispanic origin.

=== Native Hawaiian and Other Pacific Islander ===
	Average population (x 1,000)	Live births^{1}	Deaths	Natural change^{1}	Crude birth rate (per 1,000)	Crude death rate (per 1,000)	Natural change (per 1,000)	Fertility rates
2016	534 (0.2%)	9,342 (0.24%)			16.8			2.08
2017	547 (0.2%)	9,426 (0.24%)			16.7			2.09
2018	571 (0.2%)	9,476 (0.25%)	3,277	6,199	16.6			2.11
2019	579 (0.2%)	9,770 (0.26%)	3,491	6,279	17.0			2.18
2020	588 (0.2%)	9,626 (0.27%)	4,439	5,187	16.1			2.13
2021		9,531 (0.26%)	5,223	4,308	15.8			2.13
2022		10,122 (0.27%)	4,592	5,530	16.5			2.15
2023		10,115 (0.28%)			16.1			2.14
2024		10,375 (0.29%)	4,431	5,944	15.9			2.19
2025		10,172 (0.29%)	4,625	5,547				

=== Hispanic (of all racial groups) ===
- Notes: Estimates for the population of each race by year (available starting in 2000) do not include multiracial individuals which have been "bridged" to the single-race categories for the purposes of calculating the birth and fertility rates.

New Hampshire did not start reporting Hispanic origin until 1993, and Oklahoma until 1991, so data from those states are excluded before then.

	Average population (x 1,000)	Live births	Deaths	Natural change	Crude birth rate (per 1,000)	Crude death rate (per 1,000)	Natural change (per 1,000)	Fertility rates
1990^{2}	22,354 (9.0%)	595,073 (14.31%)			26.7			2.96
1991^{2}		623,085 (15.16%)			26.5			2.96
1992^{2}		643,271 (15.82%)			26.1			2.96
1993		654,418 (16.36%)			25.4			2.89
1994		665,026 (16.82%)			24.7			2.84
1995		679,768 (17.43%)			24.1			2.80
1996		701,339 (18.02%)			23.8			2.77
1997		709,767 (18.29%)	95,460	614,307	23.0	3.1	19.9	2.68
1998		734,661 (18.64%)	98,406	636,255	22.7	3.0	19.6	2.65
1999		764,339 (19.30%)	103,740	660,599	22.5	3.1	19.4	2.65
2000	35,662 (12.6%)	815,868 (20.10%)	107,254	708,614	23.1	3.0	20.1	2.73
2001	37,144 (13.0%)	851,851 (21.16%)	113,413	738,438	22.9	3.1	19.8	2.73
2002	38,618 (13.4%)	876,642 (21.80%)	117,135	759,507	22.7	3.0	19.7	2.71
2003	40,049 (13.8%)	912,329 (22.31%)	122,026	790,303	22.8	3.0	19.8	2.74
2004	41,501 (14.2%)	946,349 (23.01%)	122,416	823,933	22.8	3.0	19.9	2.76
2005	43,024 (14.5%)	985,505 (23.81%)	131,161	854,344	22.9	3.0	19.9	2.79
2006	44,606 (14.9%)	1,039,077 (24.36%)	133,004	906,073	23.3	3.0	20.3	2.86
2007	46,197 (15.3%)	1,062,779 (24.62%)	135,519	927,260	23.0	2.9	20.1	2.84
2008	47,794 (15.7%)	1,041,239 (24.51%)	139,241	901,998	21.8	2.9	18.9	2.71
2009	49,327 (16.1%)	999,548 (24.20%)	141,576	857,972	20.3	2.9	17.4	2.53
2010	50,740 (16.4%)	945,180 (23.63%)	144,490	800,690	18.7	2.9	15.8	2.35
2011	51,940 (16.7%)	918,129 (23.22%)	149,635	768,494	17.6	2.9	14.7	2.24
2012	52,961 (16.9%)	907,677 (22.96%)	156,419	751,258	17.1	3.0	14.1	2.19
2013	53,986 (17.1%)	901,033 (22.91%)	163,241	737,792	16.7	3.0	13.7	2.15
2014	55,279 (17.3%)	914,065 (22.92%)	169,387	744,678	16.5	3.0	13.5	2.13
2015	56,690 (17.6%)	924,048 (23.27%)	179,457	744,591	16.3	3.2	13.1	2.12
2016	57,399 (17.8%)	918,447 (23.27%)	188,254	730,193	16.0	3.3	12.7	2.09
2017	58,846 (18.1%)	898,764 (23.31%)	197,249	701,515	15.2	3.3	11.9	2.01
2018	59,872 (18.3%)	886,210 (23.37%)	204,719	681,491	14.8	3.4	11.4	1.96
2019	60,572 (18.5%)	886,467 (23.65%)	212,397	674,070	14.6	3.5	11.1	1.94
2020	61,188 (18.5%)	866,713 (23.98%)	305,708	561,005	14.0	4.9	9.2	1.88
2021	62.112	885,916 (24.18%)	315,664	570,252	14.1	5.1	9.0	1.90
2022	63.204	937,421 (25.56%)	275,684	661,737	14.7	4.4	10.3	1.96
2023	64.633	945,200 (26.28%)	258,896	686,304	14.5	4.0	10.5	1.94
2024		984,092 (27.12%)	260,799	723,293	14.5			1.92
2025		969,907 (27.18%)	264,768	705,139				

=== Multiracial ===
	Average population (x 1,000)	Live births	Deaths	Natural change	Crude birth rate (per 1,000)	Crude death rate (per 1,000)	Natural change (per 1,000)	Fertility rates
2023		88,988 (2.47%)						
2024		91,601 (2.52%)	16,782	74,819				
2025		96,401 (2.64%)	17,082	79,319				

== See also ==
- Demographic history of the United States
- Demographics of the United States
- History of immigration to the United States
- Majority minority
- Race and ethnicity in censuses
- Race and ethnicity in the United States
- Race and ethnicity in the United States census
