= Pugh =

Pugh is a surname of Welsh origin (from the term ap Huw, meaning 'son of Hugh'), or Irish origin.

Notable people with the surname include:

- Alf Pugh (1869–1942), Wales international football goalkeeper
- Alun Pugh (born 1955), former Labour Welsh Assembly Government Minister for Culture, Welsh Language and Sport
- Catherine Pugh (born 1950), American Democratic politician and mayor of Baltimore
- Cecil Pugh (1898–1941), South African recipient of the George Cross, the only clergyman so awarded
- Charlie Pugh (1896–1951), Welsh rugby player
- Clifton Pugh (1924–1990), Australian artist
- Coy Pugh (born 1952), American politician
- Daniel Patrick Pugh (born 1956), sportscaster and radio personality, known professionally as "Dan Patrick"
- Danny Pugh (born 1982), English footballer
- David Pugh (disambiguation), several people
- Derek S. Pugh (1930–2015), British psychologist and founder of the Aston Group
- Dylan Pugh, American politician
- Esther Pugh (1834–1908), American reformer, editor, publisher
- Evan Pugh (1828–1864), first president of the Pennsylvania State University
- Evan Pugh (1718–1787), Alderman and Sheriff of London
- Florence Pugh (born 1996), English actress
- Gareth Pugh (born 1981), English fashion designer
- George E. Pugh (1822–1876), American politician and U.S. senator from Ohio
- Griffith Pugh (1909–1994), British mountaineer on the 1953 British Mount Everest Expedition
- Gwilym Puw, sometimes anglicised as William Pugh (c. 1618 – c. 1689), Welsh Catholic poet and Royalist officer
- Hugh Pugh (disambiguation)
- Isaac C. Pugh (1805–1874), Union general in the American Civil War
- J. A. Pugh (1833–1887), American Civil War photographer
- James E. Pugh (born 1950), trombonist
- James L. Pugh (1820–1907), U.S. senator from Alabama, and member of the Confederate Congress during the American Civil War
- Jamin Pugh (1984–2023), American professional wrestler better known as Jay Briscoe
- Jethro Pugh (1944–2015), former National Football League player
- Jim Pugh (born 1964), American former tennis player
- John Pugh (disambiguation)
- Jonathan Pugh (born 1962), English cartoonist
- Ken Pugh (born c. 1959), American experimental psychologist
- Lewis Pugh (born 1969), British environmental campaigner, maritime lawyer and endurance swimmer
- Lewis Pugh Pugh (1837–1908), Welsh lawyer and politician
- Madelyn Pugh (1921–2011), writer known for her work on the television show I Love Lucy
- Marc Pugh (born 1987), English footballer
- Mallory Pugh (born 1998), maiden name of American soccer player Mallory Swanson
- Marion Pugh (1919–1976), American football player
- Mark Pugh (born 1985), American professional wrestler better known as Mark Briscoe
- Martin Pugh (musician), British guitarist
- Martin Pugh (historian), British historian
- Mary Pugh, mathematician
- Max Pugh, French-English filmmaker
- Philip Pugh (1679–1760), Welsh minister
- Ralph Pugh (1910–1982), English historian
- Richie Pugh (born 1983), Welsh rugby union player
- Robert Pugh (born 1950), Welsh film and television actor
- Sheenagh Pugh (born 1950), British poet, novelist and translator
- Steve Pugh (born 1966), British comic book artist
- Steve Pugh (politician) (1961–2011), member of the Louisiana House of Representatives for District 73 (2008–2020)
- Stuart Pugh (1929–1993), engineer, innovator, and author; inventor of the Pugh Decision-matrix method
- Tim Pugh (born 1967), former Major League Baseball pitcher
- Toby Sebastian (born 1992), English actor and musician, born Sebastian Toby M. Pugh, brother of Florence Pugh
- Tom Pugh (disambiguation)
- Virginia Wynette Pugh, better known as Tammy Wynette (1942–1998), American country singer
- Will Pugh (born 1984), lead singer for pop rock group Cartel
- Willard E. Pugh (born 1959), American actor
- William Pugh (disambiguation)
- Zachary Levi Pugh (born 1980), American actor of the television show Chuck
