= Pueblo speech =

1919 speech by U.S. President Woodrow Wilson

The Pueblo speech was an address in favor of the League of Nations, given by US President Woodrow Wilson on the afternoon of September 25, 1919, in Pueblo, Colorado. It was the last of a series of speeches he gave advocating American entry into the League of Nations. In front of a crowd of over 3,000 people, Wilson delivered a speech that was over 6,100 words long. Shortly afterwards, he collapsed and the tour was prematurely ended. The speech is sometimes considered to have been a moving performance, but has also been noted for its attacks on "hyphenated Americans". The historian John Milton Cooper deemed it "the closing lines of one of the greatest speaking careers in American history."

== Background ==
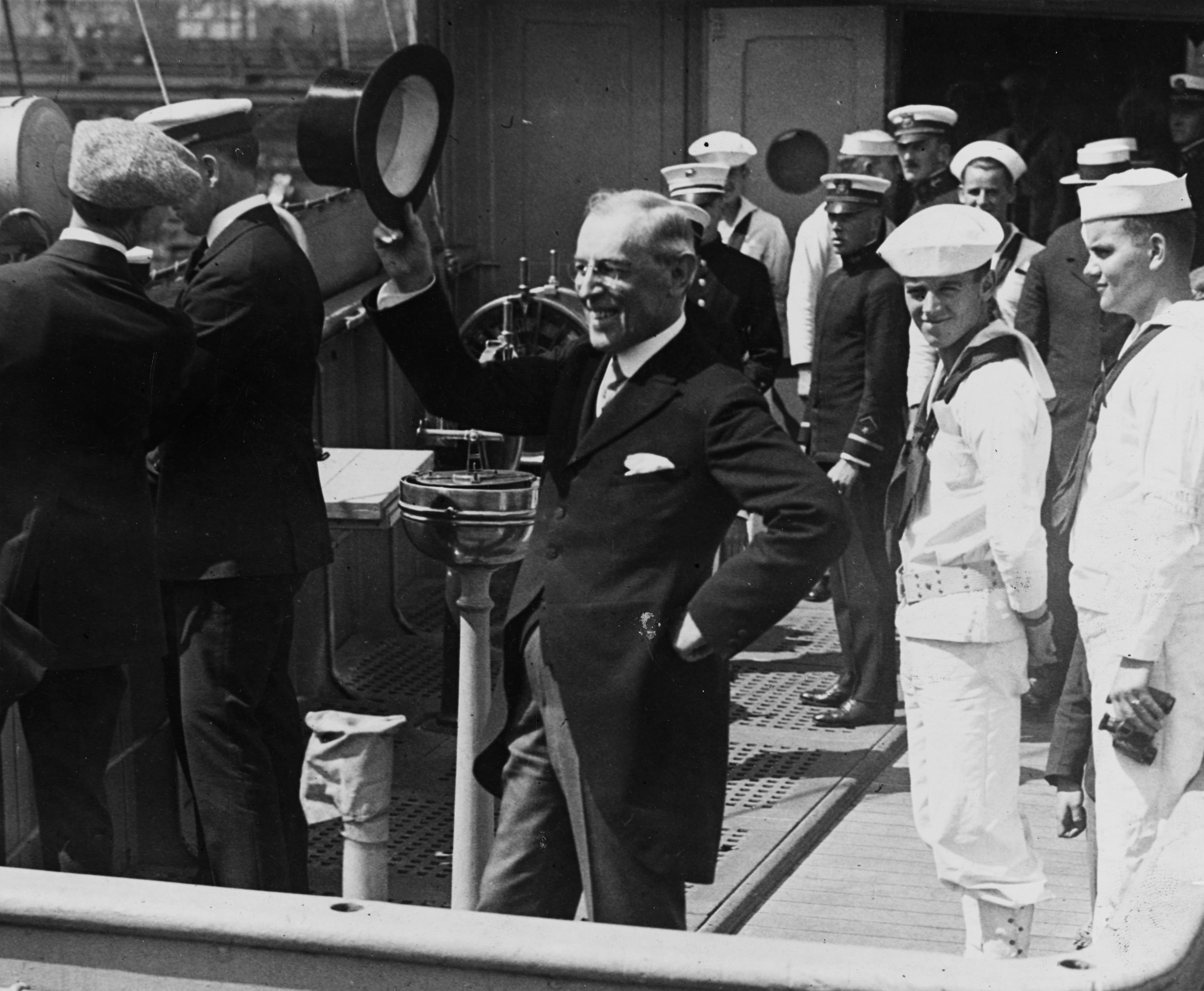
Wilson returning from the Versailles Peace Conference, 1919.

In the wake of the settlements agreed at the 1919 Paris Peace Conference, Woodrow Wilson, the President of the United States, began an effort to convince the United States Congress to ratify both the treaty and to approve American participation the League of Nations, which Wilson had proposed as part of his Fourteen Points. In 1919, Wilson embarked on a speaking tour of the Western United States, arguing in favor of ratification of the Covenant of the League of Nations and responding to criticisms of it. In a "crusade" that historian Leroy G. Dorsey describes as "one of the most dramatic political events of the twentieth century", Wilson traveled 8,000 miles (13,000 km) over the course of 22 days and gave forty speeches. This seriously strained his health.

As the trip progressed, Wilson became increasingly inflamed and dramatic over the issue as he spoke in locations like Salt Lake City, Utah, and Cheyenne, Wyoming, at one point threatening to kill himself if the treaty was ratified with "reservations".

== Speech ==
Wilson delivered a speech in Denver on the morning of September 25, which was enthusiastically received by the general public. He left Denver at 11:00 a.m. for Pueblo, Colorado. A contemporary newspaper described the crowd as "a great many", noting that attendance at the Colorado State Fair was much higher as people turned out to hear Wilson speak. Before his speech there had been speculation Wilson would face steel workers who were on strike in Pueblo, but the strikers did not affect his visit. When Wilson arrived, he visited the fairgrounds where an estimated 10,000 people had gathered to see him.

That day, Wilson "could hardly see" because of a bad headache. He told Cary T. Grayson, his aide, that "this will have to be a short speech" shortly before delivering it. Wilson gave his speech inside the Pueblo Memorial Hall, to a crowd of over 3,000 people. He dedicated the hall in memory of soldiers who died during World War I. Former Colorado Governor Alva Adams introduced Wilson.

Wilson began speaking after 3:00 p.m. and was greeted by cheers which reportedly lasted for ten minutes. The speech he gave was 6,152 words long and summarized what he had said across the tour but added little new insight. He urged the audience to "sweep aside all this language of jealousy" and echoed Theodore Roosevelt by saying "we have got to adopt or reject it [the Covenant of the League of Nations]. There is no middle course." He warned the audience of how militarized America might become if it did not join the League and ended by proclaiming that America has seen "the truth of justice and of liberty and peace. We have accepted that truth, and we are going to be led by it, and it is going to lead us, and, through us, the world out into pastures of quietness and peace such as the world has never dreamed of before." Joseph Patrick Tumulty, Wilson's secretary, wrote that he was "like a great organist playing on the heart emotions of the thousands of people who were held spell-bound by what he said." William Allen White, an early biographer of Wilson, described him as crying while he gave the speech. Hogan argues that the speech saw "name-calling and threats" substituted for "reasoned explication of the treaty."

One of the most famous lines from the speech attacked "hyphenated Americans", saying "Any man who carries a hyphen about with him carries a dagger that he is ready to plunge into the vitals of this Republic whenever he gets the chance."

== Legacy and analysis ==
Although Wilson was scheduled to speak at least five more times on the tour, after delivering his speech in Pueblo he was described as "very tired and suffering". He collapsed at 10 p.m. that night and the remainder of the tour was cancelled upon his doctor's orders. In early October Wilson had a stroke. He was essentially incapacitated for the remaining two years of his presidency, and died in 1924. The Pueblo speech was the last speech Wilson delivered and the last time he publicly spoke to the American people on a large scale. Wilson later said that it "would have been better" if he had died immediately after giving the Pueblo speech. Historian John Milton Cooper notes that the speech represents "the closing lines of one of the greatest speaking careers in American history." The United States never joined the League of Nations.

The speech is generally considered Wilson's "most moving" from the tour, and has developed into what Hogan considers "the legend of Pueblo." For instance, the 1944 film Wilson includes a liberal depiction of the speech, embellishing its circumstances and content. The historian Thomas A. Bailey considered it "the high point of the entire trip". Cooper considered the Pueblo speech to be "one of his best performances of this part of the tour." The politician Daniel Patrick Moynihan wrote that it was "as moving as anything in the language of the American presidency" and "[a] speech from the cross." The scholar J. Michael Hogan, in his book on Wilson's tour, noted that Wilson "lashed out" at critics of his plan and feels that it "betrayed" Wilson's principles, threatened to destroy bipartisan support, and "foreshadowed some of the worst tendencies of the modern rhetorical presidency."

Mark Stein's play Mr. Wilson's Peace of Mind includes a fragment of the speech. In a 1979 review of the play, a critic for The Washington Post described Wilson's vision of world peace that was presented in the Pueblo speech as "highly unpresidential, rather foolish, and yet genuinely moving."

== Bibliography ==
- Cooper, John Milton (2001). Breaking the Heart of the World. Cambridge University Press. ISBN 978-0-521-80786-9.
- Di Nunzio, Mario R., ed. (2006). Woodrow Wilson: Essential Writings and Speeches of the Scholar-President. NYU Press. ISBN 0-8147-1984-8.
- Dorsey, Leroy G. (1999). "Woodrow Wilson's Fight for the League of Nations: A Reexamination". Rhetoric & Public Affairs. 2 (1): 107–135. doi:10.1353/rap.2010.0052. ISSN 1534-5238. S2CID 146410375.
- Hogan, J. Michael (2006). Woodrow Wilson's Western Tour: Rhetoric, Public Opinion, And the League of Nations. Texas A&M University Press. ISBN 978-1-58544-533-2.
- Smith, Gene (1964). When the Cheering Stopped: The Last Years of Woodrow Wilson. New York, Morrow.
- Stone, Ralph A. (1970). The Irreconcilables: The Fight Against the League of Nations. University Press of Kentucky. ISBN 978-0-8131-1199-5.
- Tumulty, Joseph Patrick (1921). Woodrow Wilson as I Know Him. Doubleday, Page. ISBN 978-1-4047-6228-2.
- White, William Allen (1924). Woodrow Wilson: The Man, His Times and His Task. Houghton Mifflin.
