= Pughe =

Pughe is a surname. Notable people with the surname include:

- Hugh Pughe Lloyd (1894–1981), British Royal Air Force commander
- J. S. Pughe (1870–1909), Welsh-born American political cartoonist
- William Owen Pughe (1759–1835), Welsh antiquarian and grammarian

== See also ==
- Pugh
