= Nativism in United States politics =

The ideology of nativism—favoring native inhabitants, as opposed to immigrants—has been very common and contentious within American politics for centuries. In this context "native" does not mean Indigenous Americans or American Indians, but refers to early European settlers and their descendants. Nativist movements have existed since before American independence, and have targeted a wide variety of nationalities. Historically, nativism was present even in colonial America. During that era, anti-German feelings, particularly towards the Pennsylvania Dutch, ran deep. Later on, when the U.S. became its own nation, the Federalist Party expressed opposition to the French Revolution, and also passed the 1798 anti-immigrant Alien and Sedition Acts. When immigration rates to the nation exploded in the 1840s and 1850s, nativism returned with a renewed fervor, with the word nativism itself coined by 1844, and the formation of the Know Nothing Party.

In the late 19th century, going into the early 20th, nativism began to reappear. Contemporary laws and treaties included the 1882 Chinese Exclusion Act, the 1907 Gentlemen's Agreement (preventing Japanese immigration), the 1921 Emergency Quota Act, and the 1924 Immigration Act. Nativists and labor unions also argued for literacy tests, arguing that it would stop illiterate immigrants from Southern or Eastern Europe. In the 1970s, the immigration reductionism movement, which exists to this day, was formed. In the 2010s, the Tea Party movement, which split off from the Republican Party, brought a new form of nativism. Donald Trump introduced several nativist policies, such as the 2017 Trump travel ban.

== Background ==
=== Nativism ===
According to Merriam-Webster, nativism is defined as:

1. a policy of favoring native inhabitants as opposed to immigrants
2. the revival or perpetuation of an indigenous culture especially in opposition to acculturation

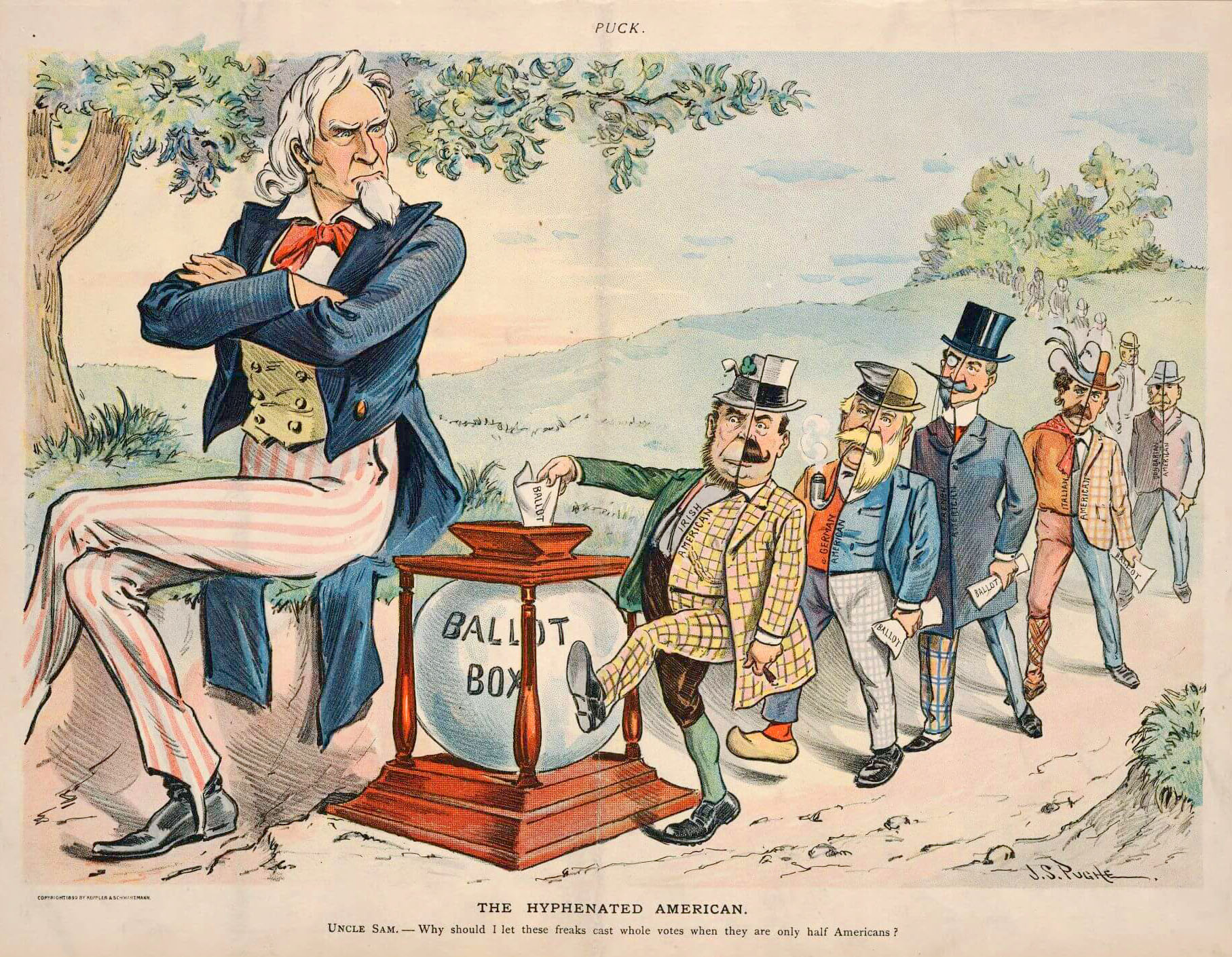
Cartoon from Puck, August 9, 1899 by J. S. Pughe. Uncle Sam sees hyphenated voters and asks, "Why should I let these freaks cast whole ballots when they are only half Americans?"

=== Nativism in United States politics ===
Is opposition to an internal minority on the basis of its supposed “un-American” foundation. Historian Tyler Anbinder defines a nativist as:

someone who fears and resents immigrants and their impact on the United States, and wants to take some action against them, be it through violence, immigration restriction, or placing limits on the rights of newcomers already in the United States. “Nativism” describes the movement to bring the goals of nativists to fruition.

According to the historian John Higham, nativism is:

an intense opposition to an internal minority on the grounds of its foreign (i.e., “un-American”) connections. Specific nativist antagonisms may and do, vary widely in response to the changing character of minority irritants and the shifting conditions of the day; but through each separate hostility runs the connecting, energizing force of modern nationalism. While drawing on much broader cultural antipathies and ethnocentric judgments, nativism translates them into zeal to destroy the enemies of a distinctively American way of life.

== History ==
=== Colonial America ===
In the Pennsylvania Colony of British America, there existed widespread anti-German sentiment among Anglo-Americans (English settlers who were established in the colonies throughout the 17th century). This sentiment was particularly directed towards the Pennsylvania Dutch or Pennsylvania Germans, who originated from the Palatinate region of Europe. Rooted deeply in cultural biases and economic rivalry, Anglo-Americans harbored suspicions and often scorned the language, traditions, and religious practices of the Palatines.

Benjamin Franklin articulated his grievances regarding the arrival of Palatine Germans in his work "Observations Concerning the Increase of Mankind" (1751), expressing concern over the influx of "Palatine boors" into their settlements. Franklin questioned the wisdom of allowing Pennsylvania, originally founded by the English, to become dominated by "aliens" who would eventually outnumber the English settlers, leading to a Germanization of the colony rather than the Anglicization of the newcomers. Franklin argued that these newcomers would resist adopting English language and customs, just as they could not change their "complexion".

=== Early Republic ===
Nativism became a major issue in the late 1790s, when the Federalist Party expressed its strong opposition to the French Revolution. Federalists were especially troubled by Republican leader Albert Gallatin, an immigrant from Geneva, Switzerland. Fearing that he represented foreign interests, the Federalists had him expelled from the Senate on a technicality in 1794. They then began to build their nativist appeals. They sought to strictly limit immigration, and to stretch the time to 14 years for citizenship. During the 1798 Quasi-War with France, the Federalists passed the Alien and Sedition Acts. They included the Alien Act, the Naturalization Act and the Sedition Act. The movement was led by Alexander Hamilton, despite his own status as an immigrant. Phillip Magness argues that "Hamilton's political career might legitimately be characterized as a sustained drift into nationalistic xenophobia." Thomas Jefferson and James Madison led the opposition by drafting the Virginia and Kentucky Resolutions. The two laws against aliens were motivated by fears of a growing Irish radical presence in Philadelphia, where they supported Jefferson. However, they were not actually enforced. President John Adams annoyed his fellow Federalists by making peace with the Republic of France, and he also annoyed them by splitting his party in 1800. Jefferson was elected president, and was able to reverse most of the hostile legislation.

=== 1830–1860 ===
The rate of immigration into the new nation was slow until 1840, when it suddenly expanded, with the arrival of a total of over 4 million Irish and German (and other) immigrants, men, women and children, from 1840–1860. Nativist movements immediately emerged. The term "nativism" appeared by 1844: "Thousands were Naturalized expressly to oppose Nativism, and voted the Polk ticket mainly to that end." Nativism gained its name from the "Native American" parties of the 1840s and 1850s. In this context "Native" does not mean Indigenous Americans or American Indians but rather those European descendants of the settlers of the original Thirteen Colonies. Nativists objected primarily to Irish Roman Catholics because of their loyalty to the Pope and also because of their supposed rejection of republicanism as an American ideal.

Nativist movements included the Know Nothing or "American Party" of the 1850s, the Immigration Restriction League of the 1890s, and the anti-Asian movements in the Western states, resulting in the passage of the Chinese Exclusion Act of 1882 and the signing of the "Gentlemen's Agreement of 1907", by which the government of Imperial Japan prevented Japanese nationals from emigrating to the United States. Labor unions were strong supporters of Chinese exclusion and limits on immigration, because they feared that immigrants would lower wages and make it harder for workers to organize themselves into unions.

==== Know Nothing Party mid-1850s ====
The Know Nothing party had a marching song they chanted in 1855:

The Natives are up, d'ye see...
They have seen a foreign band,
By a servile priesthood led,
Polluting this Eden-land,
And the graves of the patriot dead.
The boy and the bearded man,
Have left the sweets of home,
To resist a ruthless clan--
The knaves of the Church of Rome.
The Natives! The Natives!! The Natives!!

Nativist outbursts occurred in the Northeast from the 1830s to the 1850s, primarily in response to a surge of Irish Catholic immigration. The leadership was mostly obscure local men, although 1836 the famous painter and telegraph inventor Samuel Morse was a leader. In 1844 the Order of United Americans was founded as a nativist fraternity, following the Philadelphia Nativist Riots.

The nativists went public in 1854 when they formed the "American Party", which was especially hostile to the immigration of Irish Catholics, and campaigned for laws to require longer wait time between immigration and naturalization; these laws never passed. Henry Winter Davis, the Know-Nothing Congressman from Maryland, blamed the un-American Catholic immigrants for the election of James Buchanan in 1856, stating:

The recent election has developed in an aggravated form every evil against which the American party protested. Foreign allies have decided the government of the country – men naturalized in thousands on the eve of the election. Again in the fierce struggle for supremacy, men have forgotten the ban which the Republic puts on the intrusion of religious influence on the political arena. These influences have brought vast multitudes of foreign-born citizens to the polls, ignorant of American interests, without American feelings, influenced by foreign sympathies, to vote on American affairs; and those votes have, in point of fact, accomplished the present result.

It was at this time that the term "nativist" first appeared, as their opponents denounced them as "bigoted nativists". Former President Millard Fillmore ran on the American Party ticket for the Presidency in 1856, although he gave only weak support to nativism. The American Party also included many former Whigs who ignored nativism, and included (in the South) a few Roman Catholics whose families had long lived in America. Conversely, much of the opposition to Roman Catholics came from Protestant Irish immigrants and German Lutheran immigrants, who were not native at all and can hardly be called "nativists."

This form of American nationalism is often identified with xenophobia and anti-Catholic sentiment. In Charlestown, Massachusetts, a nativist mob attacked and burned down a Catholic convent in 1834 (no one was injured). In the 1840s, small scale riots between Roman Catholics and nativists took place in several cities. In Philadelphia in 1844, a series of nativist assaults on Catholic churches and community centers resulted in the loss of lives on both sides. Local volunteer fire brigades were often responsible. Alarmed community leaders found a partial solution in professionalization of the police forces. In Louisville, Kentucky, election-day rioters killed at least 22 people in attacks on German and Irish Catholics on "Bloody Monday," 6 August 1855.

The new Republican Party kept its nativist element suppressed during the 1860s, since immigrants were urgently needed for the Union Army. Nativism experienced a short revival in the 1890s, led by Protestant Irish immigrants hostile to the immigration of European Catholics, especially the American Protective Association. Political parties had a strong ethno-cultural base. Protestant immigrants from England, Ireland, Scotland, and Scandinavia favored the Republicans during the Third Party System (1854–1896), while Irish Catholics, Germans and others were usually Democratic.

=== 20th century ===
According to Erika Lee, in the 1890s the old stock Yankee upper-class founders of the Immigration Restriction League were, “convinced that Anglo-Saxon traditions, peoples, and culture were being drowned in a flood of racially inferior foreigners from Southern and Eastern Europe.”

In the 1890s–1920s era, nativists and labor unions campaigned for immigration restriction following the waves of workers and families from Southern and Eastern Europe, including the Kingdom of Italy, the Balkans, Poland, Austria-Hungary, and the Russian Empire. A favorite plan was the literacy test to exclude workers who could not read or write their own foreign language. Congress passed literacy tests, but presidents—responding to business needs for workers—vetoed them. Senator Henry Cabot Lodge argued the need for literacy tests, and described its implication on the new immigrants:

It is found, in the first place, that the illiteracy test will bear most heavily upon the Italians, Russians, Poles, Hungarians, Greeks, and Asiatics, and lightly, or not at all, upon English-speaking emigrants, or Germans, Scandinavians, and French. In other words, the races most affected by the illiteracy test are those whose emigration to this country has begun within the last twenty years and swelled rapidly to enormous proportions, races with which the English speaking people have never hitherto assimilated, and who are most alien to the great body of the people of the United States.

Responding to these demands, opponents of the literacy test called for the establishment of an immigration commission to focus on immigration as a whole. The United States Immigration Commission, also known as the Dillingham Commission, was created and tasked with studying immigration and its effect on the United States. The findings of the commission further influenced immigration policy and upheld the concerns of the nativist movement.

==== Political forces ====
The goal of the political forces which existed during the Progressive Era was to create special purpose organizations that would bring activists together and motivate them to achieve specific goals. The Immigration Restriction League was especially active in setting up chapters, and it was also active in forming working and cooperative arrangements with a range of good government groups, labor unions, and prohibitionists. On the other side, multiple organizations also existed. The National German-American Alliance, funded by the beer industry, played a leadership role in opposing prohibition and women's suffrage in the Midwest. The Ancient Order of Hibernians had an urban presence among politically active Irish Catholics. The Irish-controlled Democratic machines in big cities represented the new immigrants at the local level and they also opposed prohibition and women's suffrage. The Jewish community also began to lobby against restrictions on immigration, because pogroms in Russia and restricted opportunities in much of Europe made the United States a highly attractive destination for millions of Eastern European Jews. A powerful influence came from big business and heavy industry, such as steel and mining, because they depended on cheap immigrant labor; steamship companies also helped out. As a result, the restrictionists were outnumbered and outmaneuvered until the United States entered the war as an ally of Great Britain, an enemy of Germany. During the war, almost all immigration from Europe was halted. Additionally, German Americans were considered pariahs; the National German-American Alliance was forced to disband. Furthermore, the anti-British and anti-dry Irish factor was also weakened. The new configuration also allowed the women's movement to gain enough support to put suffrage over the top, and it also succeeded in making the final push towards national prohibition. Immigration restriction now gained the necessary momentum and it continued to build until its final victory in 1924.

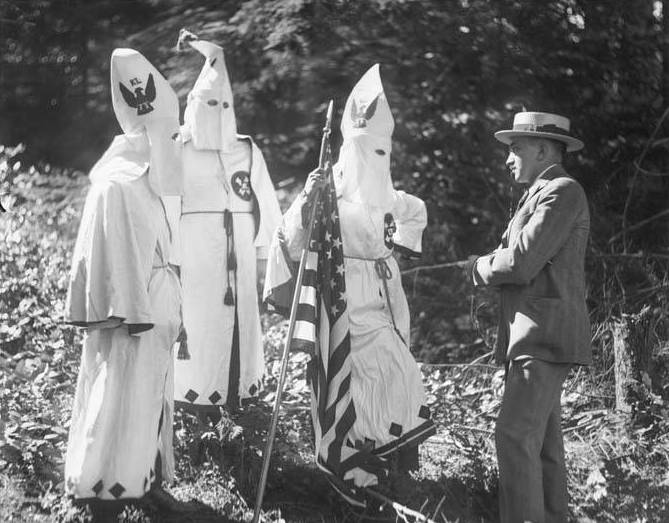
Three Klansmen talking to newspaper reporter Robert Berman in Seattle, Washington (circa 1923).

==== 1920s ====
In the early 1920s, the Second Ku Klux Klan, promoted an explicitly nativist, anti-Catholic, and anti-Jewish stance. The racial concern of the anti-immigration movement was linked to the eugenics movement that was active during the same period. Led by Madison Grant's book, The Passing of the Great Race nativists grew more concerned with the racial purity of the United States. In his book, Grant argued that the American racial stock was being diluted by the influx of new immigrants from the Mediterranean, Ireland, the Balkans, and the ghettos. The Passing of the Great Race reached wide popularity among Americans and influenced immigration policy in the 1920s.

In the 1920s, a wide national consensus sharply restricted the overall inflow of immigrants from southern and eastern Europe. After intense lobbying from the nativist movement, Congress passed the Emergency Quota Act in 1921. This bill was the first to place numerical quotas on immigration. It capped the inflow of immigrations to 357,803 for those arriving outside of the western hemisphere. However, this bill was only temporary, as Congress began debating a more permanent bill. The Emergency Quota Act was followed with the Immigration Act of 1924, a more permanent resolution. This law reduced the number of immigrants able to arrive from 357,803, the number established in the Emergency Quota Act, to 164,687. Though this bill did not fully restrict immigration, it considerably curbed the flow of immigration from Southern and Eastern Europe.

==== Late 20th century ====
An immigration reductionism movement was formed in the 1970s and it continues to exist in the present day. Prominent members of it often press for massive, sometimes total, reductions in immigration levels. American nativist sentiment experienced a resurgence in the late 20th century, this time, it was directed at undocumented workers, mostly Mexicans, resulting in the passage of new penalties against illegal immigration in 1996. Most immigration reductionists see illegal immigration, principally from across the United States–Mexico border, as the most pressing concern. Authors such as Samuel Huntington have also portrayed recent Hispanic immigration as causing a national identity crisis and they have also portrayed it as causing insurmountable problems for social institutions in the US.

=== 21st century ===
By late 2014, the Tea Party movement had turned its focus away from economic issues, and towards attacking President Barack Obama's immigration policies, which it saw as a threat to transform American society. The Tea Party tries to defeat Republicans who supported immigration programs, especially Senator John McCain. A typical slogan appeared in the Tea Party Tribune: "Amnesty for Millions, Tyranny for All." The New York Times reported:

What started five years ago as a groundswell of conservatives committed to curtailing the reach of the federal government, cutting the deficit and countering the Wall Street wing of the Republican Party has become a movement largely against immigration overhaul. The politicians, intellectual leaders and activists who consider themselves part of the Tea Party have redirected their energy from fiscal austerity and small government to stopping any changes that would legitimize people who are here illegally, either through granting them citizenship or legal status.

According to Breanne Leigh Grace and Katie Heins, Republicans have recently been using their control of state legislatures to establish nativistic immigration policies. In 2017 and 2018 they introduced 86 bills around the country to limit refugee resettlement, with their goal being to block Brown, Muslim, and Third World arrivals, which they associated with terrorism and feared as enemies of white, Christian American civilization. White nationalistic elements of the party were especially active in lobbying efforts.

Political scientist and pollster Darrell Bricker argues nativism is the root cause of the early 21st century wave of populism:

[T]he jet fuel that’s really feeding the populist firestorm is nativism, the strong belief among an electorally important segment of the population that governments and other institutions should honour and protect the interests of their native-born citizens against the cultural changes being brought about by immigration. This, according to the populists, is about protecting the “Real America” (or “Real Britain” or “Real Poland” or “Real France” or “Real Hungary”) from imported influences that are destroying the values and cultures that have made their countries great.

Importantly, it’s not just the nativists who are saying this is a battle over values and culture. Their strongest opponents believe this too, and they are not prepared to concede the high ground on what constitutes a “real citizen” to the populists. For them, this is a battle about the rule of law, inclusiveness, open borders, and global participation.

==== First Trump presidency (2016–2021) ====
In his 2016 bid for the presidency, Republican candidate Donald Trump was accused of introducing nativist themes via his controversial stances on temporarily banning foreign Muslims from six specific countries entering the United States, and erecting a substantial wall between the US-Mexico border to halt illegal immigration. Journalist John Cassidy wrote that Trump was transforming the GOP into a populist, nativist party:

Trump has been drawing on a base of alienated white working-class voters, seeking to remake the G.O.P. into a more populist, nativist, avowedly protectionist, and semi-isolationist party that is skeptical of immigration, free trade, and military interventionism.

Donald Brand, a professor of political science, argues:

Donald Trump's nativism is a fundamental corruption of the founding principles of the Republican Party. Nativists champion the purported interests of American citizens over those of immigrants, justifying their hostility to immigrants by the use of derogatory stereotypes: Mexicans are rapists; Muslims are terrorists.

===== Travel ban =====
Following the 2015 San Bernardino attack, Trump promised to ban Muslim foreigners from entering the United States until stronger vetting systems could be implemented. As a candidate in 2016 he proposed a ban to apply to countries with a "proven history of terrorism".

On January 27, 2017, President Trump signed Executive Order 13769, which suspended admission of all refugees for 120 days and denied entry to citizens of Iraq, Iran, Libya, Somalia, Sudan, Syria, and Yemen for 90 days, citing security concerns. The order took effect immediately and without warning. A federal judge blocked its implementation nationwide. On March 6, Trump issued a revised order, which excluded Iraq and gave other exemptions, but was again blocked by federal judges in three states. In a decision in June 2017, the Supreme Court ruled that the ban could be enforced on visitors who lack a "credible claim of a bona fide relationship with a person or entity in the United States". Other revised proclamations followed. The Supreme Court ultimately upheld the travel ban in a June 2019 ruling.

== Asian targets ==
=== Anti-Chinese ===
In the 1870s and 1880s in the Western states, ethnic White immigrants, especially Irish Americans targeted violence against Chinese workers, driving them out of smaller towns. Denis Kearney, an immigrant from Ireland, led a mass movement in San Francisco in the 1870s that incited racist attacks on the Chinese there and threatened public officials and railroad owners. The Chinese Exclusion Act of 1882 was the first of many nativist acts of Congress which attempted to limit the flow of immigrants into the U.S.. The Chinese responded to it by filing false claims of American birth, enabling thousands of them to immigrate to California. The exclusion of the Chinese caused the western railroads to begin importing Mexican railroad workers in greater numbers ("traqueros").

=== Anti-Japanese ===
Attacks on the Japanese in the Western U.S., echoing the dreaded Yellow Peril became increasingly xenophobic after the unexpected Japanese triumph over the supposedly powerful Russian Empire in the Russo-Japanese War of 1904–1905. In October 1906, the San Francisco Board of Education passed a regulation whereby children of Japanese descent would be required to attend racially segregated and separate schools. At the time, Japanese immigrants made up 1% of the state's population; many of them had come under the treaty in 1894 which had assured free immigration from Japan. In 1907, nativists rioted up and down the West Coast demanding exclusion of Japanese immigrants and imposition of segregated schools for Caucasian and Japanese students.

The California Alien Land Law of 1913 was specifically created to prevent land ownership among Japanese citizens who were residing in the state of California. In 1918 courts ruled that American-born children had the right to own land. California proceeded to strengthen its Alien land law in 1920 and 1923 and other states followed.

According to Gary Y. Okihiro, the Japanese government subsidized Japanese writers in America especially Kiyoshi Kawakami and Yamato Ichihashi to refute the hostile stereotypes and establish a favorable image of Japanese in the American mind. Thus Kawakami's books especially Asia at the Door (1914) and The Real Japanese Question (1921) tried to refute the false slanders generated by deceitful agitators and politicians. The publicists confronted the main allegations regarding lack of assimilation, and boasted of the positive Japanese contributions to American economy and society, especially in Hawaii and California.

== European targets ==
=== Anti-German ===
From the 1840s to the 1920s, German Americans were often distrusted because of their separatist social structure, their German-language schools, their attachment to their native tongue over English, and their neutrality during World War I.

The Bennett Law caused a political uproar in Wisconsin in 1890, as the state government passed a law that threatened to close down hundreds of German-language elementary schools. Catholic and Lutheran Germans rallied to defeat Governor William D. Hoard. Hoard attacked German American culture and religion:

"We must fight alienism and selfish ecclesiasticism.... The parents, the pastors and the church have entered into a conspiracy to darken the understanding of the children, who are denied by cupidity and bigotry the privilege of even the free schools of the state."

Hoard, a Republican, was defeated by the Democrats. A similar campaign in Illinois regarding the "Edwards Law" led to a Republican defeat there in 1890.

==== World War I ====
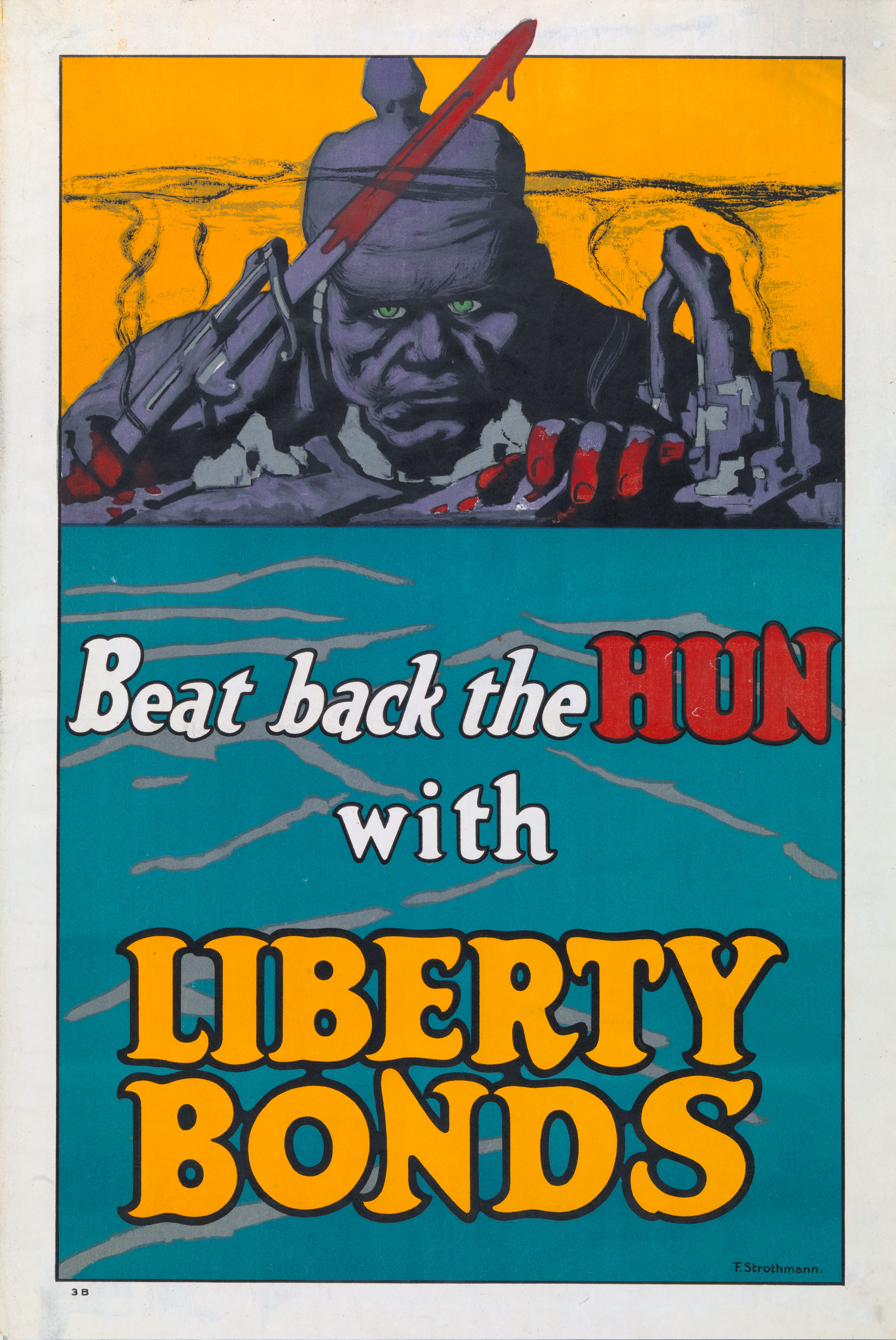
1918 bond posters with germanophobic slogans

In 1917–1918, after the U.S. declared war on Germany, a wave of nativist sentiment led to the suppression of German cultural activities in the United States. There was little violence, but a few places and many streets had their names changed. Churches switched to English for their services, and German Americans were forced to buy war bonds to show their patriotism.

Former president Theodore Roosevelt denounced "hyphenated Americanism", insisting that dual loyalties were impossible in wartime. The Justice Department attempted to prepare a list of all German aliens, counting approximately 480,000 of them, more than 4,000 of whom were imprisoned in 1917–18. The allegations included spying for Germany, or endorsing the German war effort. Thousands were forced to buy war bonds to show their loyalty. The Red Cross barred individuals with German last names from joining in fear of sabotage. One person was killed by a mob; in Collinsville, Illinois, German-born Robert Prager was dragged from jail as a suspected spy and lynched.

=== Anti-Irish Catholic ===
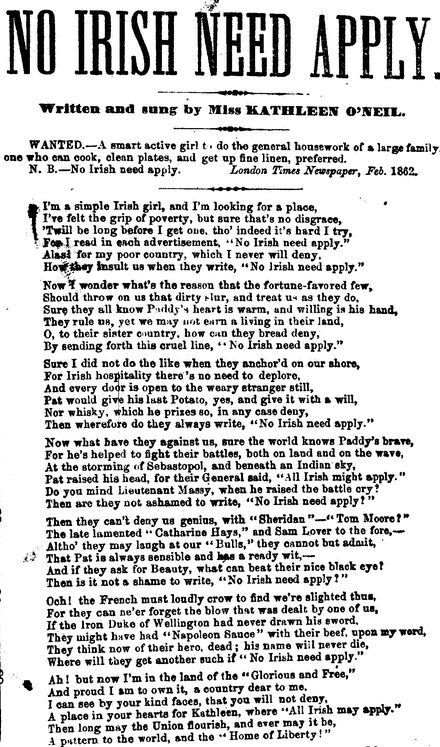
1862 song (Female versian)

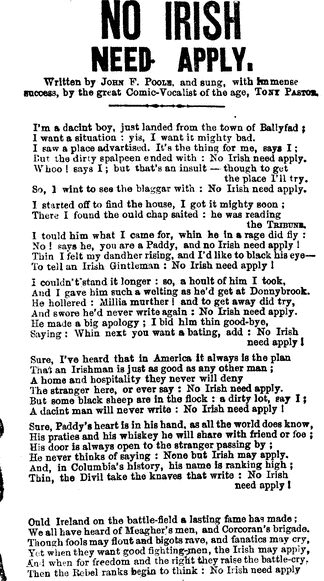
1862 song that used the "No Irish Need Apply" slogan. It was copied from a similar London song.

Anti-Irish sentiment was rampant in the United States during the 19th and early 20th century. Rising Nativist sentiments among Protestant Americans in the 1850s led to increasing discrimination against Irish Americans. Prejudice against Irish Catholics in the U.S. reached a peak in the mid-1850s with the Know Nothing movement, which tried to oust Catholics from public office. After a year or two of local success, the Know Nothing Party vanished.

Catholics and Protestants kept their distance; intermarriage between Catholics and Protestants was uncommon, and strongly discouraged by both Protestant ministers and Catholic priests. As Dolan notes, "'Mixed marriages', as they were called, were allowed in rare cases, though warned against repeatedly, and were uncommon." Rather, intermarriage was primarily with other ethnic groups who shared their religion. Irish Catholics, for example, would commonly intermarry with German Catholics or Poles in the Midwest and Italians in the Northeast.

Irish-American journalists "scoured the cultural landscape for evidence of insults directed at the Irish in America." Much of what historians know about hostility to the Irish comes from their reports in Irish and in Democratic newspapers.

While the parishes were struggling to build parochial schools, many Catholic children attended public schools. The Protestant King James Version of the Bible was widely used in public schools, but Catholics were forbidden by their church from reading or reciting from it. Many Irish children complained that Catholicism was openly mocked in the classroom. In New York City, the curriculum vividly portrayed Catholics, and specifically the Irish, as villainous.

The Catholic archbishop John Hughes, an immigrant to America from County Tyrone, Ireland, campaigned for public funding of Catholic education in response to the bigotry. While never successful in obtaining public money for private education, the debate with the city's Protestant elite spurred by Hughes' passionate campaign paved the way for the secularization of public education nationwide. In addition, Catholic higher education expanded during this period with colleges that evolved into such institutions as the University of Notre Dame, Fordham University and Boston College providing alternatives to Irish and other Catholics who avoided Protestant schools.

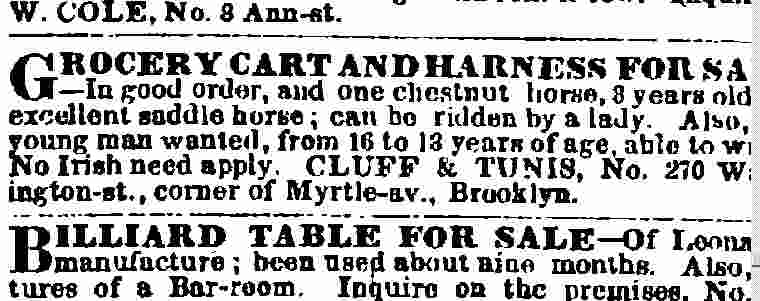
New York Times want ad 1854—the only New York Times ad with NINA for men.

Many Irish work gangs were hired by contractors to build canals, railroads, city streets and sewers across the country. In the South, they underbid slave labor. One result was that small cities that served as railroad centers came to have large Irish populations.

==== Stereotypes ====
Irish Catholics were popular targets for stereotyping in the 19th century. According to historian George Potter, the media often stereotyped the Irish in America as being boss-controlled, violent (both among themselves and with those of other ethnic groups), voting illegally, prone to alcoholism and dependent on street gangs that were often violent or criminal. Potter quotes contemporary newspaper images:

You will scarcely ever find an Irishman dabbling in counterfeit money, or breaking into houses, or swindling; but if there is any fighting to be done, he is very apt to have a hand in it." Even though Pat might "'meet with a friend and for love knock him down,'" noted a Montreal paper, the fighting usually resulted from a sudden excitement, allowing there was "but little 'malice prepense' in his whole composition." The Catholic Telegraph of Cincinnati in 1853, saying that the "name of 'Irish' has become identified in the minds of many, with almost every species of outlawry," distinguished the Irish vices as "not of a deep malignant nature," arising rather from the "transient burst of undisciplined passion," like "drunk, disorderly, fighting, etc., not like robbery, cheating, swindling, counterfeiting, slandering, calumniating, blasphemy, using obscene language, &c.

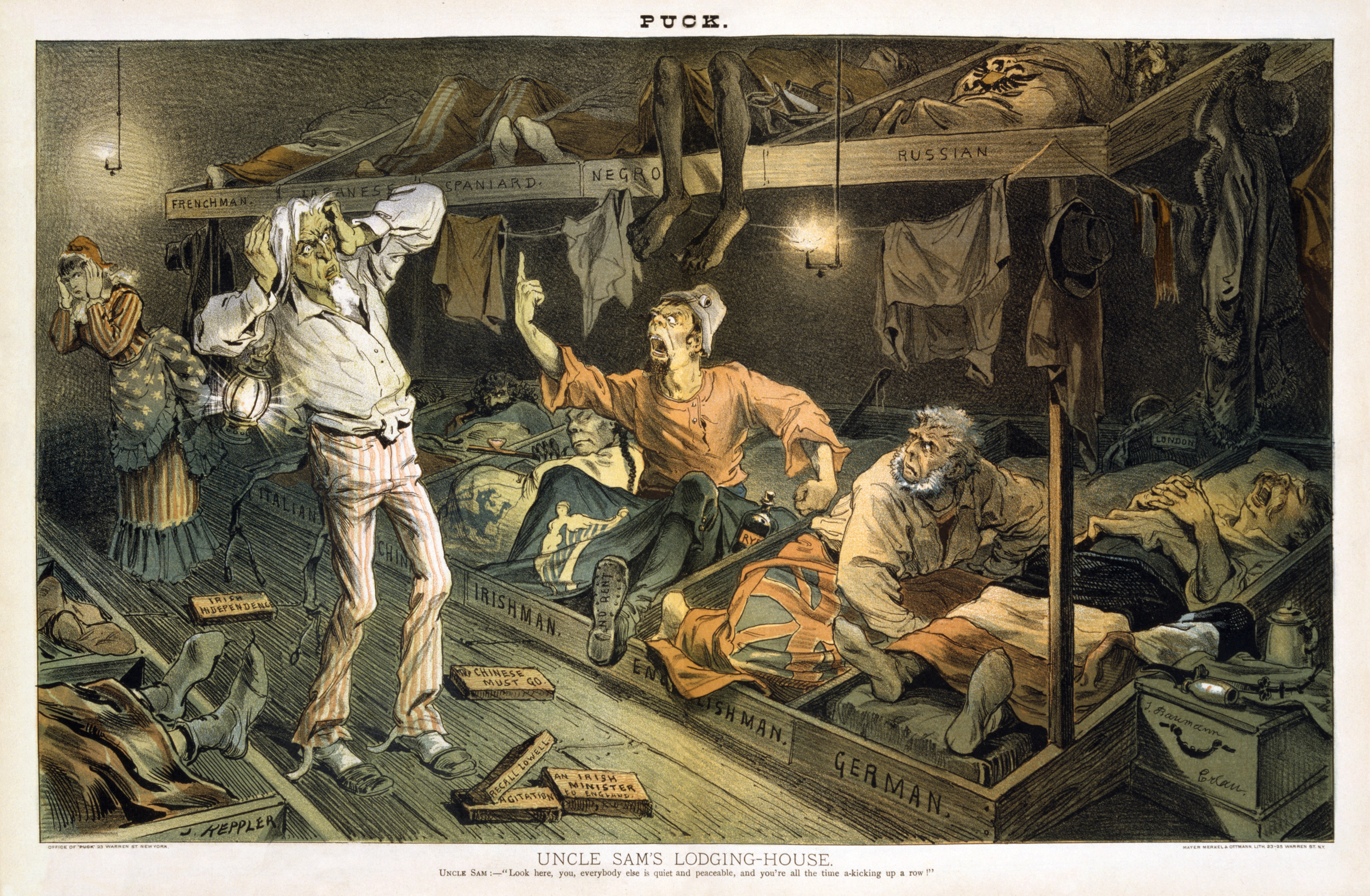
1882 illustration from Puck depicting Irish immigrants as troublemakers, as compared to those of other nationalities

The Irish had many humorists of their own, but were scathingly attacked in political cartoons, especially those in Puck magazine from the 1870s to 1900; it was edited by secular Germans who opposed the Catholic Irish in politics. In addition, the cartoons of Thomas Nast were especially hostile; for example, he depicted the Irish-dominated Tammany Hall machine in New York City as a ferocious tiger.

The stereotype of the Irish as violent drunks has lasted well beyond its high point in the mid-19th century. For example, President Richard Nixon once told advisor Charles Colson that "[t]he Irish have certain — for example, the Irish can't drink. What you always have to remember with the Irish is they get mean. Virtually every Irish I've known gets mean when he drinks. Particularly the real Irish."

Attitudes regarding Irish Catholics depended on gender. Irish women were sometimes stereotyped as "reckless breeders" because some American Protestants feared high Catholic birth rates would eventually result in a Protestant minority. Many native-born Americans claimed that "their incessant childbearing [would] ensure an Irish political takeover of American cities [and that] Catholicism would become the reigning faith of the hitherto Protestant nation." Irish men were also targeted, but in a different way than women were. The difference between the Irish female "Bridget" and the Irish male "Pat" was distinct; while she was impulsive but fairly harmless, he was "always drunk, eternally fighting, lazy, and shiftless". In contrast to the view that Irish women were shiftless, slovenly and stupid (like their male counterparts), girls were said to be "industrious, willing, cheerful, and honest—they work hard, and they are very strictly moral".

The Irish as trouble makers was a belief held by many Americans. This notion was held due to the fact that the Irish topped the charts demographically in terms of arrests and imprisonment. They also had more people confined to insane asylums and poorhouses than any other group. From the 1860s onwards, Irish Americans were stereotyped as terrorists and gangsters, although this stereotyping began to diminish by the end of the 19th century.

=== Anti-Jewish ===
Steady immigration, especially from Germany, increased the size of the Jewish population from 1500 in the 1770s to 250,000 by the 1860s. According to Hasia Diner: " In large measure due to the fact that itinerant peddlers, young men willing to go anywhere, served as the juggernauts of Jewish migration, Jews penetrated every region for commercial purposes and made possible Jewish life in every large city and in hundreds upon hundreds of small towns." Down to the 1860s, according to Jonathan Sarna, actual relations with Gentiles were generally positive despite a backdrop of old popular prejudices:

From colonial days onward, Jews and Christians cooperated with one another, maintaining close social and economic relations. Intermarriage rates, a reliable if unwelcome sign of religious harmony, periodically rose to high levels. And individual Jews thrived, often rising to positions of wealth and power. Yet popular prejudice based on received wisdom continued nonetheless.... In the Civil War as before, Jews in general suffered because of what the word "Jew" symbolized, while individual Jews won the respect of their fellow citizens and emerged from the fratricidal struggle more self-assured than they had ever been before.

In 1862 during the Civil War, General Ulysses S. Grant issued an order (quickly rescinded by President Abraham Lincoln) of expulsion against Jews from the portions of Tennessee, Kentucky and Mississippi which were under his control. (See General Order No. 11) As president in 1869–1877, however, Grant was especially favorable to Jews. The 1870s marked a turning point as the first of two million Jews from Eastern Europe arrived. They spoke Yiddish, were quite poor, and concentrated in New York City where they soon dominated the garment industry. They built a Yiddish theatre system that eventually spun off the Hollywood movie studios. Unlike the politically conservative earlier arrivals, they were radical and often Socialist or even Communist.

Antisemitic discrimination by old American elites emerged in the 1870s. Upper class Jews were no longer allowed to join some social clubs nor stay in some fancy resorts; their enrollment at elite colleges was limited by quotas, and they were also not allowed to buy houses in certain neighborhoods. In response, Jews established their own country clubs, summer resorts, and universities, such as Brandeis. Antisemitic attitudes in America reached its peak during the interwar period. The sudden rise of the second Ku Klux Klan in the mid 1920s, the antisemitic works of Henry Ford, and the radio attacks of Father Coughlin in the late 1930s generated tensions nationwide.

Actual elite-level discrimination was at a much milder level than Europe. Sarna argues: "American politics resists anti-Semitism....The politics of hatred have thus largely been confined to noisy third parties and single issue fringe groups. When anti-Semitism is introduced into the political arena...major candidates generally repudiate it." Thus no major American party or major national politician was openly antisemitic. Perhaps the most notorious outlier was John E. Rankin of Mississippi, an outspoken enemy of all minorities for three decades in Congress, 1921 to 1953.

After 1945 anti-Jewish sentiment among whites steadily declined both at the elite and the popular level. However, some leaders of Black Nationalist organizations, especially the Nation of Islam, accused Jews of exploiting black laborers, profiteering by bringing alcohol and drugs into black communities, and unfairly dominating the local economy. According to annual surveys by the Anti-Defamation League, for each race, there is a strong correlation between level of education and rejection of antisemitic stereotypes. However, black Americans of all education levels are significantly more likely to be antisemitic than whites who are of the same education level. In the 1998 survey, blacks (34%) were nearly four times more likely (9%) to fall into the most antisemitic category (those who agreed with at least 6 out of 11 statements that were potentially or clearly antisemitic) than whites were. Among blacks with no college education, 43% of them fell into the most antisemitic group (vs. 18% of the general population), which fell to 27% among blacks with some college education, and 18% among blacks with a four-year college degree (vs. 5% of the general population). The most prominent black leader of the 1980s, Jesse Jackson, repeatedly denied accusations that he was antisemitic.

The 2005 Anti-Defamation League survey includes data on the attitudes of Hispanics, with 29% of Hispanics being the most antisemitic (vs. 9% of whites and 36% of blacks); being born in the United States helped alleviate this attitude: 35% of foreign-born Hispanics were antisemitic, but only 19% of those Hispanics who were born in the U.S. were antisemitic.

A Time poll of 1000 individuals which was conducted in August 2010 indicated that only 13 percent of Americans have unfavorable views of Jews, by contrast, 43 percent have unfavorable views of Muslims; 17 percent have unfavorable views of Catholics; and 29 percent have unfavorable views of Mormons. By contrast, antisemitic attitudes are much higher in Europe and are growing.

In September 2014, the New York Post released the contents of a report which was originally published by the NYPD. The report stated that since 2013, the number of antisemitic incidents in the city had increased by 35%. On the other hand, a report of the Los Angeles County Commission on Human Relations revealed a significant decrease of 48 percent in anti-Jewish crimes in LA compared to 2013.

A 2014 survey of 1,157 Jewish students at 55 campuses nationwide found that 54 percent had been subjected to or had witnessed antisemitism on their campuses. The most significant origin for antisemitism was "from an individual student" (29 percent). Other origins were in clubs or societies, in lectures and classes, and in student unions. The findings of the research were similar to a parallel study conducted in the United Kingdom.

Antisemitism in the United States has rarely erupted into physical violence against Jews. Some of the worst episodes include the attack on the funeral procession of Rabbi Jacob Joseph by Irish workers and police in New York City in 1902; the lynching of Leo Frank in Georgia in 1915; beatings of numerous Jews in Boston and New York by Irish gangs in 1943–1944; the murder of talk radio host Alan Berg in Denver in 1984; the Crown Heights riot in Brooklyn in 1991; and the murder of 11 congregants in the Pittsburgh synagogue shooting of October 2018.

== Hispanic targets ==
According to Phillip Gonzales, in the late 19th and early 20th centuries Hispanics in New Mexico frequently organized "juntas de indignación", which were protests against discrimination. Hundreds attended meetings that protested housing discrimination; Washington's perception of "backwardness" in the territory that delayed statehood; racist comments by government officials; and admission policies at the University of New Mexico. The protest style ended in the 1930s.

=== Trump's immigration policy ===
The proposed immigration policies of presidential candidate Donald Trump opened a bitter and contentious debate during the 2016 campaign. He promised to build a wall on the Mexico–United States border to restrict illegal movement and vowed Mexico would pay for it. He pledged to deport millions of undocumented immigrants residing in the United States, and criticized birthright citizenship for incentivizing "anchor babies". As president, he frequently described illegal immigration as an "invasion" and conflated immigrants with the criminal gang MS-13, though research shows undocumented immigrants have a lower crime rate than native-born Americans.

Trump attempted to drastically escalate immigration enforcement, including implementing harsher immigration enforcement policies against asylum seekers from Central America than any modern U.S. president.

From 2018 onwards, Trump deployed nearly 6,000 troops to the U.S.–Mexico border, to stop most Central American migrants from seeking U.S. asylum, and from 2020 used the public charge rule to restrict immigrants using government benefits from getting permanent residency via green cards. In addition to the 6,000 troops deployed by Trump, Mexico also sent an estimate of 15,000 troops to the border after pressure from Trump. Trump has reduced the number of refugees admitted into the U.S. to record lows. When Trump took office, the annual limit was 110,000; Trump set a limit of 18,000 in the 2020 fiscal year and 15,000 in the 2021 fiscal year. Trump was able to create such a drastic change in 2020 because of the pandemic at the time. Additional restrictions implemented by the Trump administration caused significant bottlenecks in processing refugee applications, resulting in fewer refugees accepted compared to the allowed limits.

=== Mexican border wall ===
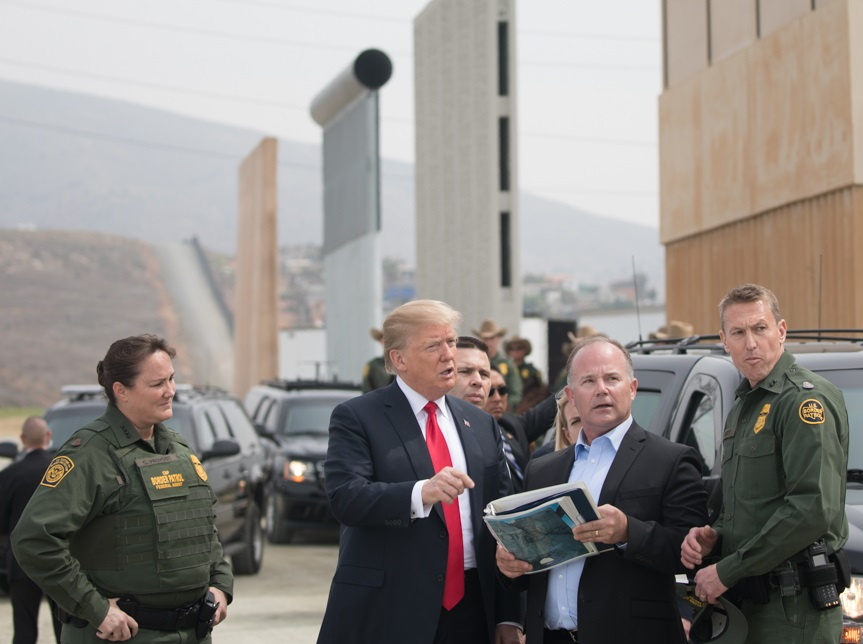
Trump examines new border wall prototypes on California–Mexico border.

One of presidential candidate Donald Trump's central, and false, campaign promises in 2016 was to build a 1,000-mile border wall to Mexico and have Mexico pay for it. By the end of his term, the U.S. had built 73 miles of primary and secondary wall in new locations, and 365 miles of fencing replacing outdated barriers. The construction and renovation of this section of wall led to a decrease of 87% in illegal crossings in the surrounding areas. In February 2019, Congress passed and Trump signed a funding bill that included $1.375 billion for 55 miles of bollard border fencing. Trump also declared a National Emergency Concerning the Southern Border of the United States, intending to divert $6.1 billion of funds Congress had allocated to other purposes. The House and the Senate attempted to block Trump's national emergency declaration, but there were not enough votes for a veto override.

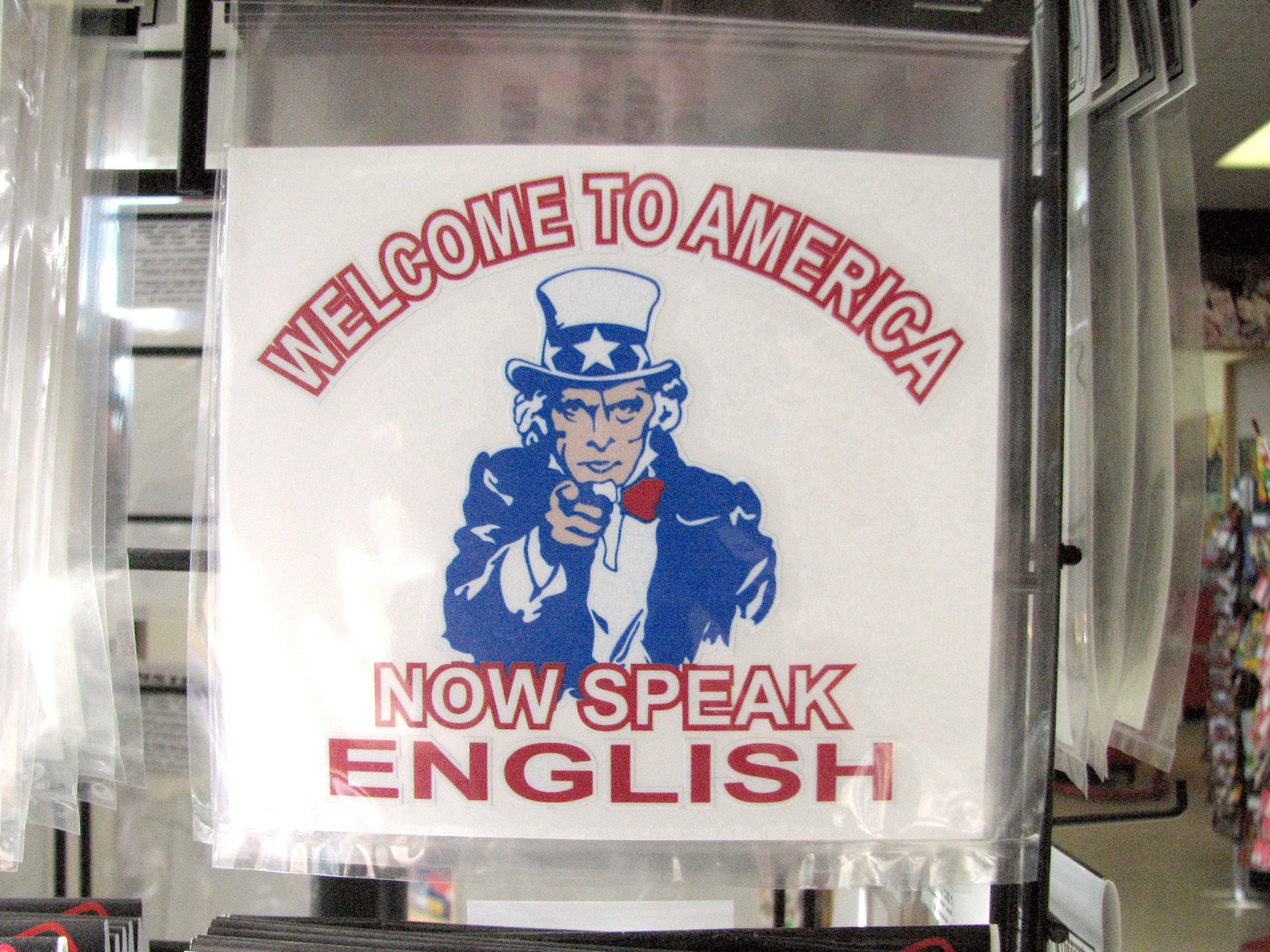
Sticker sold in Colorado

== English Only ==
For several decades, American nativists have been promoting American English and deprecating the use of German and Spanish in the United States. In the late 20th century, English-only proponents proposed the passage of an English Language Amendment (ELA), a constitutional amendment which would make English the official language of the United States, but it received limited political support.

== See also ==
- Americanism (ideology)
- Race and ethnicity in the United States
- Discrimination in the United States
- Yellow Peril
- Antisemitism in the United States
