= Aston Group =

Group of organizational researchers

Aston Group is the designation of a group of organizational researchers who pursued their research between 1961 and 1970 under the leadership of Derek S. Pugh. The official name was Industrial Administration Research Unit of the Birmingham College of Advanced Technology.And In 2014 the Group's revenue decreased by 9.8%, following decreases in sales ... (UK) Limited, Annual Revenue. $21.79 million USD for 2019. Birmingham College was renamed to Aston University in 1966. The Aston Group pioneered works in the area of statistical analysis of organizations and their functioning. Contrary to former analysis' which were based on binary factors of features - such as presence vs. absence - the group expanded the spectrum to continuous dimensions and achieved a more differentiated view of their research subject.

Members of the group originated in different areas of research such as psychology, economics, political sciences and sociology. Amongst others, John Child, David Hickson, Bob Hinings, Roy Payne, Diana Pheysey, and Charles McMillan published under the Aston-label. As did several other researchers. Remarkably, the Aston group was never associated with a single member, not even its leader Derek S. Pugh.

== Research ==
In a summary, Derek Pugh describes the works of the Aston group. According to him, there is no complete theory formulated out of the Aston findings. Their theories and results are embedded in the works of several topics of research. These topic were, according to Greenwood and Devine:

1. Derek Pugh, David Hickson and C.R. (Bob) Hinings with the relations of organizational structures and their influencers technology, size and environment.
2. Diane Pheysey, Kerr Inkson and Roy Payne worked on the relation of organizational structure and organizational climate
3. Lex Donaldson, John Child and Charles McMillan expanded the Aston-research for performance management and culture-spanning analysis'.

Malcolm Warner maintains "There is a potentially brilliant empirical theory of organizations to be written by the Aston gurus". But such a theory was never published.

A typical result from the early phase of their works is the following matrix, reflecting an early means of analyzing the extent of bureaucratization in organizations. From empirical research in 46 enterprises in the Birmingham area, the group concluded:

- that larger organizations in general are higher specialized, more standardized and formalized (structuring of activities).
- that with an increase in size, the centralization of decision-making decreases (concentration of authority).

Both results confirm empirically the expectation but do not explain the result. Based on the findings, the researchers concluded that organizations where more structure is imposed and power gets concentrated tend to become more bureaucratic.

Power/ Structurization		Structuring of activities
Power/ Structurization		Low	High
Concentration of authority	High	Personal bureaucracies	Full bureaucracies
Concentration of authority	Low	Non- bureaucracies	Workflow- bureaucracies

Based on measurable dimensions - the amount of written instructions - and a structural analysis of the power-concentration, the bureaucracy-level of an organization can easily be determined.

In an expansion and building upon the works of Max Weber, who only recognized one bureaucracy, the Aston group found a taxonomy of different types with distinguishable features and characteristics based on only three factors: concentration of authority, structuring and attention to rules. The causal relationship postulated by the group assumed that with concentration of authority within an organization, the variety of roles decreases and therefore the interpersonal interaction and motivated innovation and flexibility decreases. The factors are interconnected and influence each other. As a result, bureaucracies reduce innovation.

In a British-Canadian cooperation, group members David J. Hickson, C. R. Hinings, C. A. Lee, R. E. Schneck and J. M. Pennings developed the contingency approach to organizational power, in full the strategic "contingencies theory of interaorganizational power". According to this theory, power rests on three pillars:

- Ability to cope with uncertainty - winner is, who is more capable at dealing with environmentally caused uncertainty.
- Non-Substitutionality - the services of the department should be hard to substitute.
- Centrality - the department must be coupled into the processes of other departments.
