= Hyphenated ethnicity =

Term combining an ethnicity with a country of residence

A hyphenated ethnicity (or rarely hyphenated identity) is a reference to an ethnicity, pan-ethnicity, national origin, or national identity combined with the demonym of a country of citizenship-nationality, another national identity, or in some cases country of residency or country of upbringing. The term is an extension of the term "hyphenated American". The term refers to the use of a hyphen between the name of an ethnicity and the name of the country in compound nouns: Irish-American, etc., although modern English language style guides recommend dropping the hyphen: "Irish American".

The concept should not be confused with that of mixed ethnicity and multiraciality, i.e., the ethnicity or race of a person whose parents have different ethnicities/races, which can also be written in a hyphenated way.

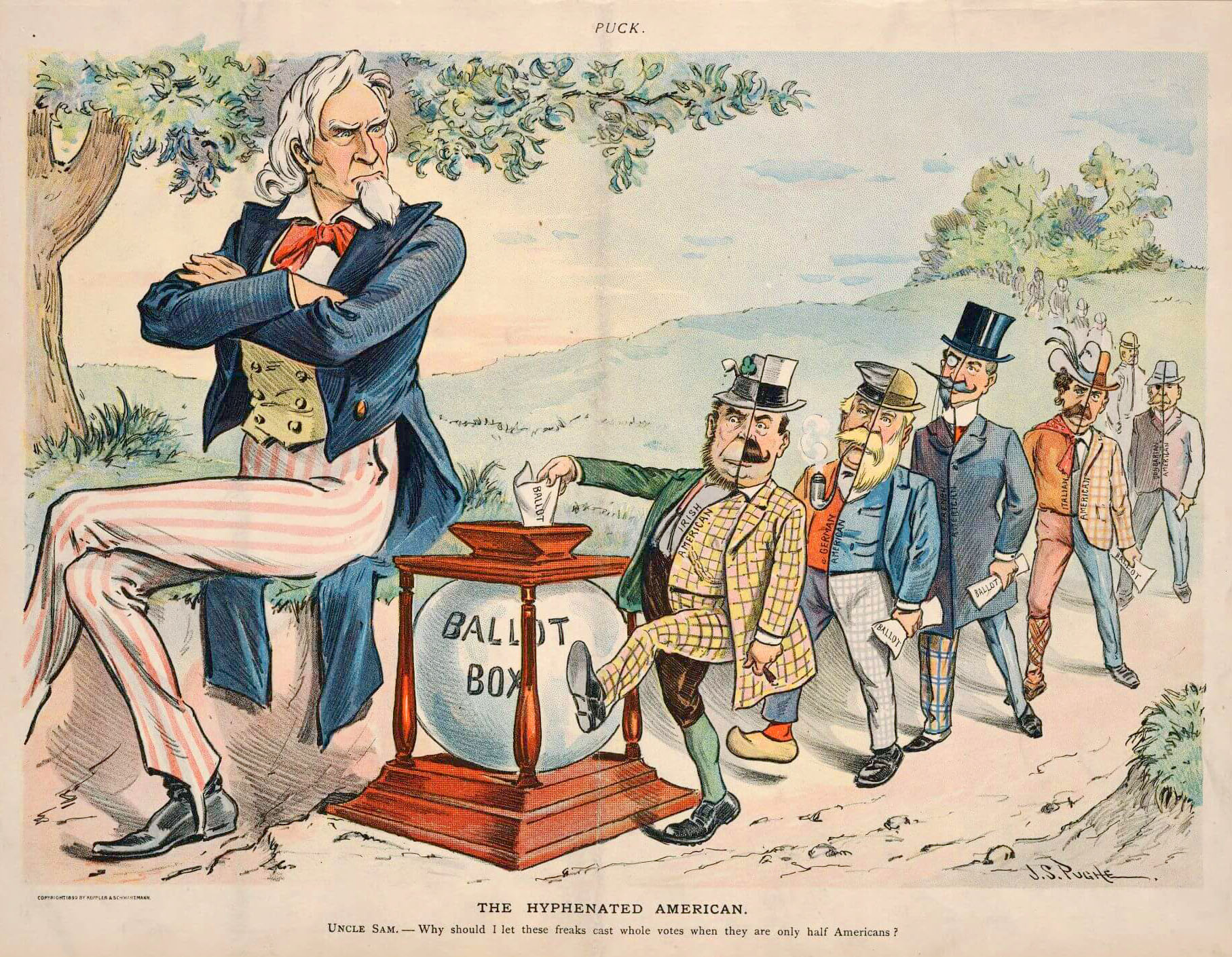
Cartoon from Puck, August 9, 1899, by J. S. Pughe. Angry Uncle Sam sees hyphenated voters (including an Irish-American, a German-American, a French-American, an Italian-American, and a Hungarian-American) and demands, "Why should I let these freaks cast whole votes when they are only half Americans?"

== United States ==
The term "hyphenated American" originated in 1890s and was used disparagingly as a reference to immigrants who, by brandishing their ethnic origin, allegedly demonstrated an incomplete allegiance to the United States, especially during the World War I period.

== Brazil ==
Jeffrey Lesser wrote: "While there are no linguistic categories that acknowledge hyphenated ethnicity (a third generation Brazilian of Japanese descendant remains 'Japanese' while a fourth-generation Brazilian of Lebanese descent may become a turco, an arabe, a sirio, or a sirio-libanese), in fact immigrant communities aggressively tried to negotiate a status that allowed for both Brazilian nationality and ethnic difference".

== See also ==
- Ethnic origin
- Melting pot
- Multiculturalism
- Nativism (politics)
