= Business/IT Fusion =

Book by Peter Hinssen

- First edition cover
- Author: Peter Hinssen
- Language: English
- Publisher: MachMedia
- Publication date: 2009
- Publication place: Belgium
- Media type: Print (Hardcover)
- Pages: 276 pp
- ISBN: 978-90-813242-3-6
- OCLC: 431959785

Business/IT Fusion: How to Move Beyond Alignment and Transform IT in Your Organization is a business book by Peter Hinssen, published in 2009. It discusses an approach to IT management different to the classic model of business/IT alignment. In place of alignment focused on the collaboration between business and IT, Hinssen suggests that the future evolution in IT lies in the convergence of the two parties: integrating IT into the business rather than treating it as a supplier. The work is presented as a guidebook to "IT 2.0".
