= Hugh Pugh =

Hugh Pugh may refer to:

- Hugh Pugh (sailor) (1794/5–1865), legendary Welsh sailor
- Hugh Pugh (priest), Welsh Anglican priest
- Hugh Pugh (fictional character), fictional character in the British TV comedy series Barry Welsh is Coming
