= David J. Hickson =

British organizational theorist (1931–2016)

David John Hickson (20 April 1931 – 22 June 2016) was a British organizational theorist and Emeritus Professor of International Management and Organization at the Bradford University School of Management, known for his work in the field of organisational development (OD).

== Life and work ==
Hickson obtained his MA at the University of Manchester Institute of Science and Technology, after he had started working. There he was spotted by the academic professor Reg Revans, who recognized his potential as researcher. Later in his career he received an Honorary Ph.D. from the University of Umea in Sweden.

In the 1950s, Hickson had started his career in financial administration, and had become Assistant Secretary of the Bristol Stock Exchange. After graduation in the late 1950s, he became research assistant at the then Birmingham College of Advanced Technology, later the Aston University. in the 1960s, he joined the Aston Group, a group of organizational researchers under the leadership of Derek S. Pugh. In collaboration with Canadian scientists they developed the contingency approach.

In the 1970s, Hickson was co-founder of the European Group for Organizational Studies (EGOS). He became Professor of International Management and Organization at Bradford School of Management, England. He was served as a visiting professor in Canada, the United States, and the Netherlands. And he was founding Editor-in-Chief of Organization Studies, an international research journal.

== Work ==
Hickson's research interests "are how societal culture affects managerial decision making in different nations and what influences the success of major decisions. His previous research has included processes of managerial decision making, power in organizations, and bureaucratization."

== Selected publications ==
- Hickson, David J., and Derek Salman Pugh. Management worldwide: The impact of societal culture on organizations around the globe. London: Penguin Books, 1995.

Articles, a selection

- Pugh, D. S., Hickson, D. J., Hinings, C. R., Macdonald, K. M., Turner, C., & Lupton, T. (1963). "A conceptual scheme for organizational analysis." Administrative Science Quarterly, 289-315.
- Pugh, D. S., Hickson, D. J., Hinings, C. R., & Turner, C. (1968). "Dimensions of organization structure." Administrative science quarterly, 65-105.
- Pugh, D. S., Hickson, D. J., Hinings, C. R., & Turner, C. (1969). "The context of organization structures." Administrative Science Quarterly, 91-114.
- Hickson, D. J., Hinings, C. R., Lee, C. A., Schneck, R. E., & Pennings, J. M. (1971). "A strategic contingencies' theory of intraorganizational power." Administrative Science Quarterly, 216-229.
