= Business–IT alignment =

Business–IT alignment (B/I alignment) is a process by which an organization integrates and utilizes information technology (IT) to achieve business objectives.

== B/I alignment and IT governance ==
To achieve B/I alignment, organizations must take into account both business and IT disciplines. Establishing processes for decision-making and control is essentially what is meant by the term "governance"; so B/I alignment is closely related to information technology governance.

A commonly cited definition by IT Governance Institute is:

IT governance is the responsibility of the board of directors and executive management. It is an integral part of enterprise governance and consists of the leadership and organizational structures and processes that ensure that the organization's IT sustains and extends the organization's strategies and objectives.

Also related to the effort for better decision-making, and therefore often part of B/I alignment - is the area of IT portfolio management, which has to do with decisions about which IT projects are funded and which are not.

== B/I alignment and business transformation ==
Ultimately, the value comes not just from the IT tools that are selected, but also from the way that they are used in the organization. For this reason, the scope of B/I alignment also includes business transformation, in which organizations redesign how work is accomplished in order to understand the efficiencies made possible by new IT. Thus, implementing IT to achieve its full potential for business value includes not only a technical component, but also an organizational change management component (see the Risk3 model below).

It is important to consider the overall value chain in technology development projects as the challenge for value creation is increasing with the competitiveness between organizations (Bird, 2010). The concept of value creation through technology is dependent upon the alignment of technology and business strategies. While the value creation for an organization is a network of relationships between internal and external environments, technology plays an important role in improving the overall value chain of an organization. This increase requires business and technology management to work as a creative, synergistic, and collaborative team instead of a purely mechanistic control instance. Technology can help the organization gain a competitive advantage within the industry it resides and generate performance at a greater value, according to Bird.

== Alignment models ==
Henderson & Venkatraman's 1993 article can be seen as the starting point of business–IT alignment.

Typical EA Frameworks are used to achieve business–IT alignment, as these frameworks link business and technology layers of the organization over common threads.

TOGAF is a framework by Open Group which defines a very strong method of developing enterprise architecture. The method is called ADM (architecture development method)

Zachman EA framework is developed by John Zachman and it defines which artifacts enterprises need to develop to be able to organize themselves better. It is also a widely accepted framework in the industry.

In the Risk3 model, the objective of B/I alignment is to manage three separate risks associated with IT projects: technical risk (will the system function as it should?), organizational risk (will individuals within the organization use the system as they should?), and business risk (will the implementation and adoption of the system translate into business value?). Business value is jeopardized unless all three risks are managed successfully.

== See also ==
- Technology alignment
