= John Pugh =

John or Johnny Pugh may refer to:

- John Pugh (Liberal Democrat politician) (born 1948), British member of parliament for Southport
- John Pugh (Tory politician) (c. 1675–1737), British member of parliament for Montgomery and Cardiganshire
- John Pugh (Canadian politician) (1821–1900), merchant and politician in Nova Scotia, Canada
- John Pugh (Pennsylvania politician) (1761–1842), U.S. congressman from Pennsylvania
- John H. Pugh (1827–1905), American physician, member of the U.S. House of Representatives from New Jersey
- John Pugh (artist) (born 1957), known for creating trompe-l'oeil public murals
- John Pugh (RAF officer) (1890–1966), Canadian World War I flying ace
- John Pugh (cricketer) (1904–1964), who played for Warwickshire
- John Pugh (priest) (1885–1961), Archdeacon of Carmarthen
- John Pugh, former member of !!!
- Johnny Pugh, American baseball player
