= Technology alignment =

Business and technology alignment, or just technology alignment, corrects terminology and assumptions used in business to better match those of technology and standards anticipated in the technology strategy and technology roadmaps.

== Changes terminology ==
When technology is changing very rapidly in an industry, the aligning of business terms to the distinctions that the technology requires tends to dominate any enterprise taxonomy development effort. In such circumstances, consultants or specific technology training is usually required, as the organization lacks the internal skills or experience with the technologies that it expects to be using soon.

== Example: government ==
In government, for example, citizen use of the Internet and the increased availability of remote work has presented special challenges and opportunities, typically called "e-government". At the same time, internal operational efficiencies have become more of a priority due to rising competition between jurisdictions. Often the first step is to limit the number of different departments or agencies involved. By "consolidating the technology operations of 91 state agencies into the Virginia Information Technology Agency, the State of Virginia estimates an eventual savings of nearly $100 million a year." -

"Similarly, the U.S. National Performance Review recommended a data processing consolidation and modernization initiative citing industry experience suggesting operational savings of between 30% and 50%." -

While "California is the cradle of the information technology industry" its own state government claims that "collaborative exploration and exploitation of emerging technologies is extremely rare within state government", accordingly it seeks to "improve customer relationships through online services." However such efforts tend to rely very much on driving personalities and leadership. After one resignation, the state "lost the vision and executive sponsorship that contributed to its success and the national recognition of California's emerging eGovernment activities." This is a major problem in all technology alignment.

In Canada, a similar nationwide effort called Service Canada has similar goals, and has run into similar problems: "The big complaints are that departments fight over their turf and are organized to serve the bureaucracy, not Canadians. They don’t share data, information, common infrastructure, technology or integrate their business processes. Senior bureaucrats are often accused of being out of touch with the needs of Canadians." - The government claims that it "is expected to save C$3 billion over five years by automating manual operations, consolidating call centres and reducing overpayments in Canada Pension Plan and employment service." It "will need to spend about C$500 million for technology, consolidate or move offices and retrain the thousands of workers whose jobs were eliminated by automation."

When, as in California or Canada, new leadership and massive change to operations is required, technology alignment may simply excuse a massive business process reengineering and downsizing exercise. This too is a common situation in technology alignment: using the fact of new technology as a pretext for other large changes.

However, as with all such exercises, there are claims that better service will result, by (in Canada) "opening new offices and creating more front-line jobs in local communities" or (in California) "a 20% reduction in the workforce performing shared services" and of "nearly 9,000 state employees... about 3,600 are engaged in common core functions. An eventual 20% reduction in this workforce segment is possible through attrition when phased in over 5 years." -

These claims also are fairly typical: despite a longstanding admission among experts that there is a "productivity paradox", the introduction of new information technology and more automated work processes are always assumed to be "more efficient" than what they replace. Accordingly, technology alignment is probably not a passing fad, but, seems to be driven by factors built into business and technology culture.

== Sources ==
- the State of California performance review
