= Breaking the Heart of the World =

2001 book by John M. Cooper

- Author: John M. Cooper
- Subject: Woodrow Wilson, League of Nations
- Genre: Historical Non-fiction
- Publisher: Cambridge University Press
- Publication date: 2001

Breaking the Heart of the World: Woodrow Wilson and the Fight for the League of Nations is a 2001 book by the historian John M. Cooper about Woodrow Wilson and his advocacy for the League of Nations. It was published by Cambridge University Press.
