= Hugh Pugh (priest) =

Welsh Anglican priest

Hugh Pugh was a Welsh Anglican priest.

Newcombe was educated at All Souls College, Oxford. He held incumbencies at Shrivenham, Ruthin and Llandudno.

He was Archdeacon of Merioneth from 1681 until his death on 22 March 1683.
