= Hyphenated American =

Term used in American politics and sociology

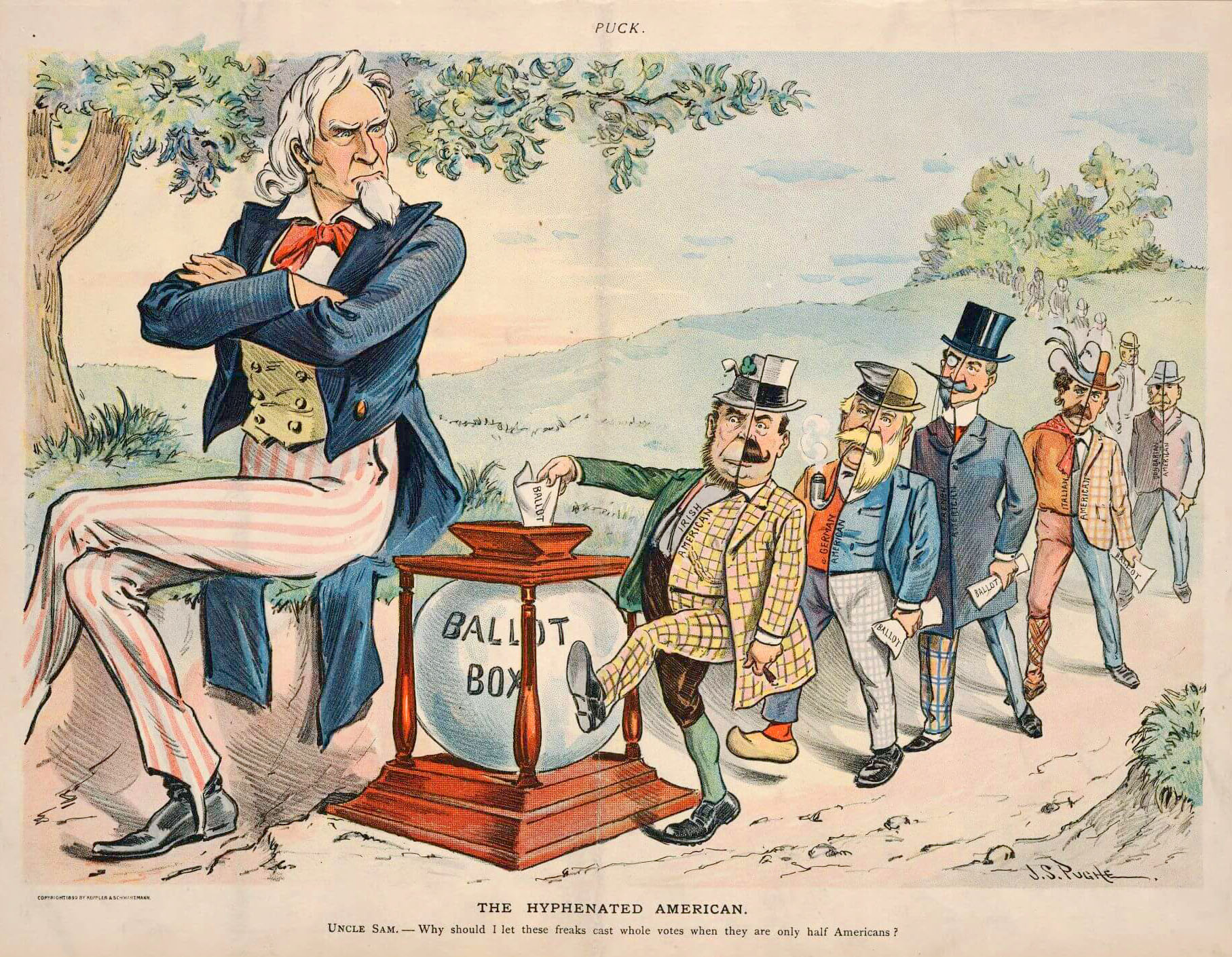
Cartoon from Puck, August 9, 1899, by J. S. Pughe. Angry Uncle Sam sees hyphenated voters (including an Irish-American, a German-American, a French-American, an Italian-American, and a Hungarian-American) and demands, "Why should I let these freaks cast whole votes when they are only half Americans?"

In the United States, the term hyphenated American refers to the use of a hyphen (in some styles of writing) between the name of an ethnicity and the word American in compound nouns, e.g., as in Irish-American. Calling a person a "hyphenated American" was used as an insult alleging divided political or national loyalties, especially in times of war. It was used from 1890 to 1920 to disparage Americans who were of foreign birth or ancestry and who displayed an affection for their ancestral heritage language and culture. It was most commonly used during World War I against Americans from White ethnic backgrounds who favored United States neutrality during the ongoing conflict or who opposed the idea of an American alliance with the United Kingdom and the creation of what is now called the "Special Relationship", even for purely political reasons.

In this context, the term "the hyphen" was a metonymical reference to this kind of ethnicity descriptor, and "dropping the hyphen" referred to full integration into the American identity. Some contemporary critics of this concept, such as Randolph Bourne in his criticism of the Preparedness Movement, accused America's White Anglo-Saxon Protestant elite of hypocrisy by showing the same divided loyalty in pushing for the "Special Relationship" that they refused to tolerate in others. Other contemporaries, like Bishop John Joseph Frederick Otto Zardetti, argued eloquently that there is no contradiction between American patriotism and loyalty to one's ancestral culture, religion, and heritage language. In a 1916 letter to the Minneapolis Journal, one Minnesota German American suggested that his own people would willingly "abandon the hyphen", but only if "Anglo-Americans" did so first.

Contemporary studies and debates refer to hyphenated American identities to discuss issues such as multiculturalism and immigration in the US political climate; however, the term "hyphen" is rarely used per the recommendation of modern style guides. In their 2018 biography of Dominican American poet Rhina Espaillat, who is known for encouraging both bilingualism and American patriotism among younger people who speak immigrant languages, Nancy Kang and Silvio Torres-Saillant criticized how, in American political discourse for decades after Espaillat's 1938 arrival as a political refugee in the United States, both the English-only movement and "the expectation that one should overcome any non-British ancestral origins, still held sway as a prerequisite to entering the sphere of genuine Americanness". Both authors also singled out the role of Woodrow Wilson and his Pueblo speech in the lengthy survival of these concepts for special criticism.

== Hyphenated Americanism, 1890–1920 ==
The term "hyphenated American" was published by 1889, and was common as a derogatory term by 1904. During World War I, the issue arose of the primary political loyalty of ethnic groups who retained close ties to their relatives in Europe, especially German Americans. In 1915, former US President Theodore Roosevelt in speaking to the largely Irish Catholic Knights of Columbus at Carnegie Hall on Columbus Day, asserted that,

There is no room in this country for hyphenated Americanism. When I refer to hyphenated Americans, I do not refer to naturalized Americans. Some of the very best Americans I have ever known were naturalized Americans, Americans born abroad. But a hyphenated American is not an American at all ... The one absolutely certain way of bringing this nation to ruin, of preventing all possibility of its continuing to be a nation at all, would be to permit it to become a tangle of squabbling nationalities, an intricate knot of German-Americans, Irish-Americans, English-Americans, French-Americans, Scandinavian-Americans or Italian-Americans, each preserving its separate nationality, each at heart feeling more sympathy with Europeans of that nationality, than with the other citizens of the American Republic ... There is no such thing as a hyphenated American who is a good American. The only man who is a good American is the man who is an American and nothing else.

President Woodrow Wilson regarded "hyphenated Americans" with suspicion, saying in his Pueblo speech: "Any man who carries a hyphen about with him carries a dagger that he is ready to plunge into the vitals of this Republic whenever he gets ready." In the 1920s, the Wall Street Journal condemned "hyphenates" who were said to be among the supporters of the Progressive Party's Robert M. La Follette Jr..

A vocal source of criticism of Roosevelt and Wilson's "anti-hyphen" ideology and particularly to their demands for "100 percent Americanism" came from the United States' enormous number of White ethnic immigrants and their descendants. Criticism from these circles occasionally argued that "100 percent Americanism" really meant the complete adoption of Anglo-American culture by White ethnics, as particularly demonstrated by Roosevelt, Wilson, John R. Rathom, and other leaders of the demand to only tolerate White Anglo-Saxon Protestant culture and the English language in the United States.

A prime example of this criticism, which argued that there is no contradiction between preserving ancestral heritage languages and American patriotism may be seen in Bishop John Joseph Frederick Otto Zardetti's September 21, 1892, "Sermon on the Mother and the Bride", which is a defence of German-Americans desire to preserve their ancestral culture and to continue speaking the German language in the United States, against both the English-only movement and accusations of being Hyphenated Americans.

Zardetti's argument is further supported and strengthened by the fact that Francis Scott Key's lyrics to the US national anthem, "The Star-Spangled Banner", have seen multiple literary translations into immigrant languages that are able to be successfully sung to the same melody. In 1861, very likely to help encourage German-American military service in the Union Army and the Navy during the American Civil War, the lyrics were translated into the German language in the United States and widely circulated in pamphlet form. The Library of Congress also has record of a Spanish-language version from 1919. It has since been translated into Hebrew and Yiddish by Jewish immigrants, Latin American Spanish (with one version popularized during immigration reform protests in 2006), Louisiana French by the Cajun people, the Irish language, and Scottish Gaelic.

Furthermore, in a letter published on July 16, 1916, in the Minneapolis Journal, Edward Goldbeck, a member of Minnesota's traditionally large German American community, sarcastically announced that his people would, "abandon the hyphen", as soon as Anglo-Americans did so. Meanwhile, he argued, "Let the exodus of Anglo-Americans start at once! Let all those people go who think that America is a new England!"

== Hyphenated American identities ==
Some groups recommend dropping the hyphen because it implies to some people dual nationalism and the inability to be accepted as truly American. The Japanese American Citizens League is supportive of dropping the hyphen because the non-hyphenated form uses their ancestral origin as an adjective for "American".

By contrast, other groups have embraced the hyphen, arguing that the American identity is compatible with alternative identities and that the mixture of identities within the United States strengthens the nation rather than weakens it.

"European American", as opposed to White or Caucasian, has been coined in response to the increasing racial and ethnic diversity of the United States, as well as to this diversity moving more into the mainstream of the society in the latter half of the twentieth century. The term distinguishes whites of European ancestry from those of other ancestries. In 1977, it was proposed that the term "European American" replace "white" as a racial label in the U.S. census, although this was not done. The term "European American" is not in common use in the United States among the general public or in the mass media, and the terms "white" or "white American" are commonly used instead.

=== Usage of the hyphen ===
Modern style guides, such as AP Stylebook, recommend dropping the hyphen between the two names; some, including The Chicago Manual of Style (CMOS), recommend dropping the hyphen even for the adjective form. On the other hand, The New York Times Manual of Style and Usage allows compounds with name fragments (bound morphemes), such as Italian-American and Japanese-American, but not "Jewish American" or "French Canadian".

The hyphen is occasionally but not consistently employed when the compound term is used as an adjective. Academic style guides (including APA, ASA, MLA, and Chicago Manual) do not use a hyphen in these compounds even when they are used as adjectives.

==== Relative to Latin America ====
Latin America includes most of the Western Hemisphere south of the United States, including Mexico, Central America, South America, and (in some cases) the Caribbean. United States nationals with origins in Latin America are often referred to as Hispanic or Latino Americans, or by their specific country of origin, e.g., Mexican Americans, Puerto Ricans, and Cuban Americans.

== See also ==
- Americanization
- Cultural nationalism
- Demographics of the United States
- Diaspora studies
- Diaspora politics
- Ethnic group
- Ethnic interest groups in the United States
- Ethnic nationalism
- Hyphenated ethnicity
- Jus sanguinis
- Melting pot
- Multiculturalism
- Multiple citizenship
- Nativism
- Political correctness
- Xenophobia in the United States
