= John Pugh (RAF officer) =

English-Canadian World War I flying ace

John Edwardes Pugh
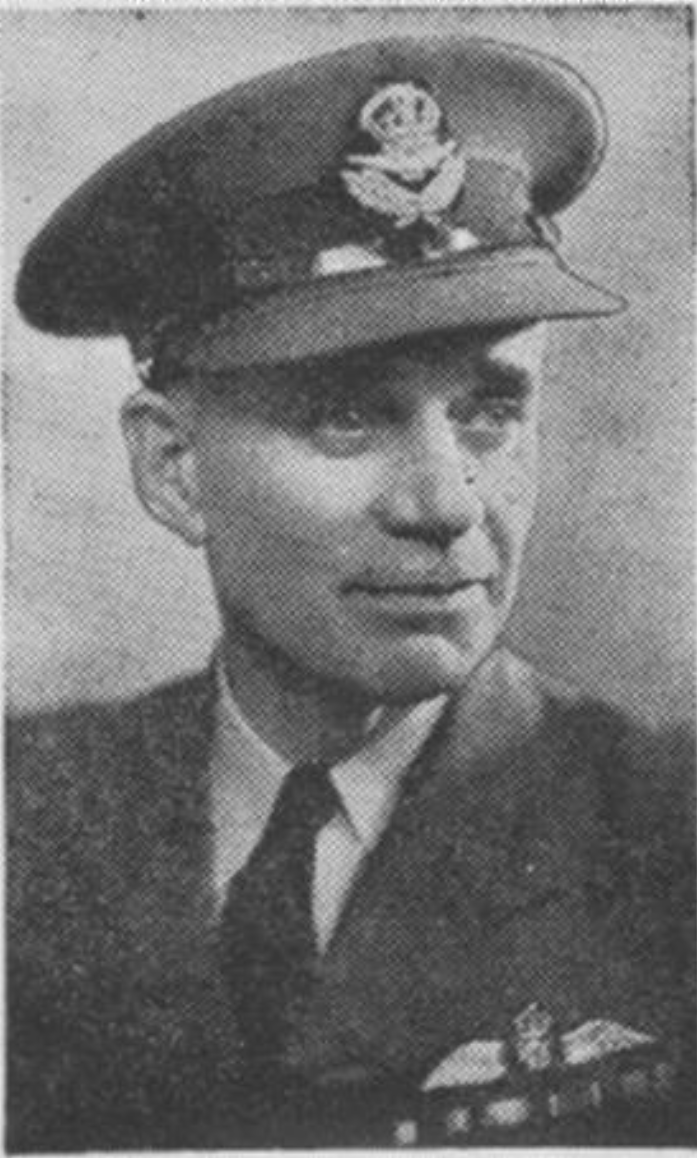
- John Edwardes Pugh MBE MC
- Born: 29 April 1890; Shotwick, Cheshire, England
- Died: 28 May 1966 (aged 76); New Westminster, British Columbia, Canada
- Military career
- Allegiance: George V of the British Empire
- Branch: Cavalry; flying service
- Rank: Captain
- Units: Alberta Dragoons, No. 25 Squadron RAF
- Awards: Military Cross, Distinguished Flying Cross

Captain John Edwardes Pugh was a Canadian World War I flying ace credited with five aerial victories.
