= William Pugh =

William Pugh may refer to:

- William Pugh (computer scientist) (born 1960), American computer scientist
- William Pugh (game designer)
- William Pugh (geologist) (1892–1974)
- William T. Pugh (1845–1928), American politician
- Gwilym Puw (c. 1618–c. 1689), sometimes anglicised as William Pugh, Welsh author
