= John Milton Cooper Jr. =

American historian

John Milton Cooper Jr. (born 1940) is an American historian, author, and educator. He specializes in late 19th and early 20th-century American political and diplomatic history with a particular focus on presidential history. His 2009 biography of Woodrow Wilson was a finalist for the Pulitzer Prize, and biographer Patricia O'Toole has called him "the world's greatest authority on Woodrow Wilson." Cooper is Professor Emeritus at the University of Wisconsin-Madison.

== Education ==
Cooper graduated in 1957 from Woodrow Wilson High School in Washington D.C. In 1961 he received his bachelor's degree summa cum laude from Princeton University, where he wrote his senior thesis under the supervision of David Herbert Donald. After graduating from Princeton he enrolled in graduate school at Columbia University, where he received a master's degree in history in 1962 and a Ph.D. in history in 1968. At Columbia he studied under Richard Hofstadter. As Cooper later explained, "For graduate study, I chose Columbia because I wanted to work with Richard Hofstadter. The way he had blended political and intellectual history particularly excited me."

== Teaching career ==
Cooper began his teaching career at Wellesley College, serving as an assistant professor of history from 1965 to 1970. He moved to the University of Wisconsin-Madison in 1970, where he taught for 39 years. He chaired the Wisconsin history department from 1988 to 1991. During his years at the University of Wisconsin, he held two endowed professorships, serving first as the William Francis Allen Professor of History and later as the E. Gordon Fox Professor of American Institutions. His teaching interests focused on American history since the Civil War era. To that end, he taught introductory and upper division courses on Gilded Age and Twentieth Century America as well as graduate seminars in U.S. political history.

== Books and awards ==
Cooper's many awards include the Guggenheim Fellowship (1979–80) In 1996 he received the University of Wisconsin-Madison Alumni Association Award for Outstanding Faculty Member. and the Fulbright Professorship in United States History, Moscow State University (1987). His book, Woodrow Wilson: A Biography, was published in 2009. The book was a finalist for the Pulitzer Prize for Biography or Autobiography.

In his books, Cooper described Wilson as an activist president, even more so than Theodore Roosevelt. For example, in an interview, Cooper observed that:

"I had learned from studying him in comparison with TR [Theodore Roosevelt] how bold a leader Wilson was—far bolder than his rival, public images to the contrary notwithstanding. From his Princeton presidency onward, Wilson had mounted audacious initiatives. Intervention in the war, the Fourteen Points, and hammering together the League were his boldest ones in foreign policy or any sphere."

But Cooper also pointed out Wilson's shortcomings. In his 2009 biography of Wilson, Cooper concluded:

"In the end, much about Wilson remains troubling. He shared his shortcomings with Abraham Lincoln, who likewise approved massive violations of freedom of speech and the press, and Thomas Jefferson, a slave owner who fathered children by a slave mistress, and Franklin Roosevelt, who approved an even worse violation of civil liberties, the internment of Japanese Americans during World War II. A consideration of Wilson poses the same ultimate question as does that of those other towering figures in the presidential pantheon: do his sins of omission and commission outweigh the good he did, or do his great words and deeds overshadow his transgressions?"

Cooper encouraged fellow historians to pursue subjects that fascinated them. In a post-retirement interview, he noted that "what I have enjoyed most has been pursuing things that have simply fascinated me. My list of biographical subjects speaks to that fascination, as do the events I have studied. Some historians may make their way mainly out of a sense of obligation or duty, but I think being attracted to a subject for its own sake brings vigor and insight."

== Media appearances ==
Cooper was the Chief Historian for the 2002 PBS documentary Woodrow Wilson, which was produced by KCET. He also served as a program advisor for the award-winning Ken Burns documentary The Roosevelts, which aired nationally on PBS in 2014.

== Selected bibliography ==
=== Books ===
- The Vanity of Power: American Isolationism and the First World War, 1914-1917 (Greenwood Press, 1969)
- Walter Hines Page: The Southerner as American, 1855-1918 (University of North Carolina Press, 1977).
- The Warrior and the Priest: Woodrow Wilson and Theodore Roosevelt (Harvard University Press, 1983).
- Pivotal Decades: The United States, 1900-1920 (WW Norton & Company, 1990).
- Breaking the Heart of the World: Woodrow Wilson and the Fight for the League of Nations (Cambridge University Press, 2001).
- editor. Reconsidering Woodrow Wilson: progressivism, internationalism, war, and peace (Woodrow Wilson Center Press, 2008).
- Woodrow Wilson: A Biography (Alfred A. Knopf, 2009).

=== Articles ===
- "William E. Borah, Political Thespian," Pacific Northwest Quarterly 56 (October, 1965), pp 145–158, awarded Charles M Gates Memorial Prize.
- "Progressivism and American Foreign Policy: A Reconsideration," Mid-America 61 (October, 1969), 260–277.
- "The British Response to the House-Grey Memorandum: New Evidence and New Questions." Journal of American History 59.4 (1973): 958–966. online
- "The Command of Gold Reversed: American Loans to Britain, 1915-1917." Pacific Historical Review 45.2 (1976): 209–230. online
- "Walter Hines Page: The Southerner as American." Virginia Quarterly Review 53.4 (1977): 660–676. online
- "'An Irony of Fate': Woodrow Wilson's Pre-World War I Diplomacy." Diplomatic History 3.4 (1979): 425–438.
- "Woodrow Wilson: The Academic Man." The Virginia Quarterly Review 58.1 (1982): 38–53. online
- "My Mission to Moscow: An American Historian in the Soviet Union." Wisconsin Magazine of History 72.1 (1988): 38–50. online
- "The shock of recognition: the impact of World War I on America." Virginia quarterly review 76.4 (2000): 567–584. online
- "The great war and American memory." The Virginia Quarterly Review 79.1 (2003): 70–84.
- with Gerstle, Gary. "Race and Nation in the Thought and Politics of Woodrow Wilson." in Reconsidering Woodrow Wilson: Progressivism, Internationalism, War, and Peace (2008): 93–124.
- "From Promoting to Ending Big Government." in The Progressives' Century (Yale University Press, 2016) pp. 157–173.
- "The Historical Presidency: Few and Mostly Far Between: Reflections on Intellectuals as Presidents." Presidential Studies Quarterly 47.4 (2017): 789–802.
