= David Pugh =

David Pugh may refer to:

- David Pugh (MP, born 1789) (1789–1861), Conservative MP for Montgomery Boroughs 1832–1833, 1847–1861
- David Pugh (MP, born 1806) (1806–1890), Liberal MP for Carmarthenshire, 1857–1868, and East Carmarthenshire, 1885–1890
- David Pugh (politician, born 1980), local Conservative politician on the Isle of Wight
- Harry Pugh (David Henry Pugh, 1875–1945), Wrexham A.F.C., Lincoln Town F.C. and Wales international footballer
- David Pugh (footballer, born 1947) (born 1947), Welsh professional footballer
- David Pugh (footballer, born 1964), Chester City F.C. and Bury F.C. footballer
- David Pugh (comics), British comics artist and writer
- David Pugh, editor of Practical Boat Owner magazine
- David Thomas Pugh (1943 - 2022), British academic and marine scientist
- David Vaughan Pugh (1907–2005), Canadian member of parliament
- David Pugh (theatre producer) (born 1959), British theatre producer
- David Pugh (American football) (born 1979), American football player
- David Pugh (actor), English actor
