= Tom Pugh =

Tom Pugh or Thomas Pugh may refer to:

- Tom Pugh (cricketer) (1937–2016), English cricketer and rackets player
- Tom Pugh (politician) (born 1949), Minnesota politician
- Tom Pugh (footballer) (born 2000), Welsh footballer
- Thomas Pugh (politician), Colonial American politician; delegate to the Fifth North Carolina Provincial Congress in 1776
