= Derek S. Pugh =

British business theorist (1930–2015)

Derek Salman Pugh (31 August 1930 – 29 January 2015) was a British psychologist, business theorist and emeritus professor of international management at the Open University, known for his work in the field of organisational development (OD), and particularly the Pugh Matrix, a tool within OD.

== Biography ==
Born in London, Pugh obtained his academical MA in 1953 and his MSc in 1956 both from the University of Edinburgh, and his DSc in 1973 from the University of Aston. In 2009, the Aston University awarded him an honorary doctorate (DLitt).

After his graduation in 1953, Pugh started his academic career as research assistant at the Social Sciences Research Centre of the University of Edinburgh, and became assistant lecturer in public health and social medicine in 1956. In 1957, he moved to the Birmingham College of Technology, where he became lecturer in human relations. In 1960, Pugh was appointed senior research fellow at the Birmingham College of Advanced Technology (later the University of Aston), in the Industrial Administration Research Unit until 1967. After another year as reader in industrial administration, he moved to the London Business School, where in 1968 he started as director of research and reader in Organizational Behaviour. From 1970 to 1982, he was Professor of Organizational Behaviour. In 1983, Pugh moved one last time to the Open University, where he was professor of systems and head of systems discipline until 1988, professor of international management from 1988 to 1995, visiting research professor of international management from 1995 to 2000, and emeritus professor of international management since 2000. Pugh had been visiting professor in France, Germany, Israel and Italy.

Pugh was elected Fellow of the Royal Statistical Society in 1959; of the British Psychological Society in 1971; of the Italian Academy of Business Administration in 1981; and of the International Academy of Management in 1987; and honorary fellow of the University of Northampton in 2001. In 1995, the Open University Business School initiated in his honour the Professor Derek Pugh Prize, an annual award for the best student on Professional Certificate in Management course of the Open University Business School.

== Selected publications ==
- Pugh, Derek Salman, ed. Organization theory: selected readings. Penguin, 1971.
- Hickson, David John, and Derek Salman Pugh. Management worldwide: distinctive styles amid globalization. Penguin Global, 2003.
- Pugh, Derek S., and David J. Hickson. Writers on organizations. Penguin UK, 2007.

Articles, a selection

- Pugh, D. S., Hickson, D. J., Hinings, C. R., & Turner, C. (1968). "Dimensions of organization structure." Administrative science quarterly, 65–105.
- Pugh, D. S., Hickson, D. J., Hinings, C. R., & Turner, C. (1969). "The context of organization structures." Administrative Science Quarterly, 91–114.
- Hickson, David J., Derek S. Pugh, and Diana C. Pheysey. "Operations technology and organization structure: An empirical reappraisal." Administrative science quarterly (1969): 378–397.
