= J. S. Pughe =

American illustrator

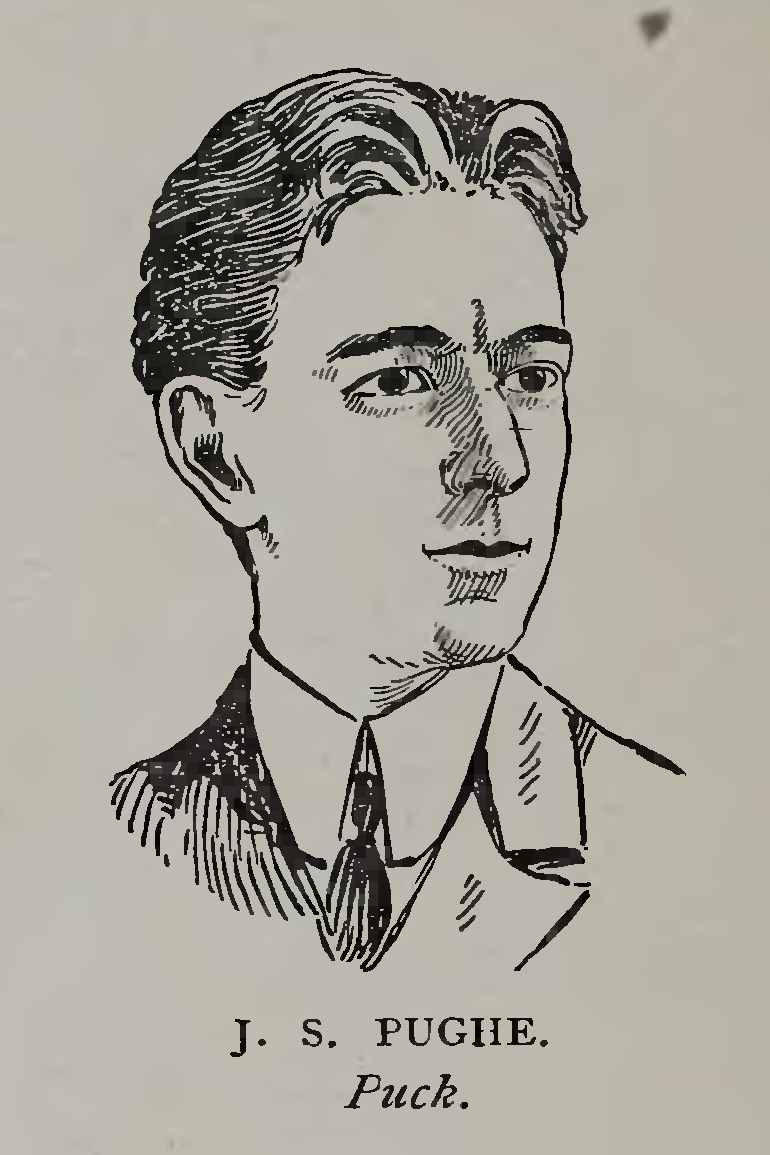

John Samuel Pughe (3 June 1870 – 19 April 1909), was a Welsh-born American political cartoonist, best known for his illustrations for Puck magazine.

== Early life and education ==
John Samuel Pughe was born in Dolgelley, Merionethshire, Wales, and brought to America by his parents when he was two years old. He studied art at Cooper Union.

== Career ==
J. S. Pughe illustrated news stories for the New York Recorder, Brooklyn Life, and the Brooklyn edition of the World as a young man. He began working at Puck magazine in 1894. He was a regular contributor there until his last cartoon for them, in December 1908.

== Personal life ==
Pughe died in 1909, age 38, at Lakehurst, New Jersey, where he had been spending several months to improve his health.

Work by Pughe were included in a 2015 digital exhibit, "Politics in Graphic Detail", created by the Historical Society of Pennsylvania. A lithograph of a Pughe cartoon was also included in "Between the Lines", an exhibit at Duke University Libraries in 2013–2014.

== Selected works ==
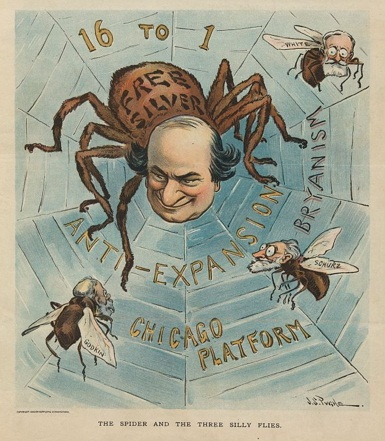
The spider and the three silly flies

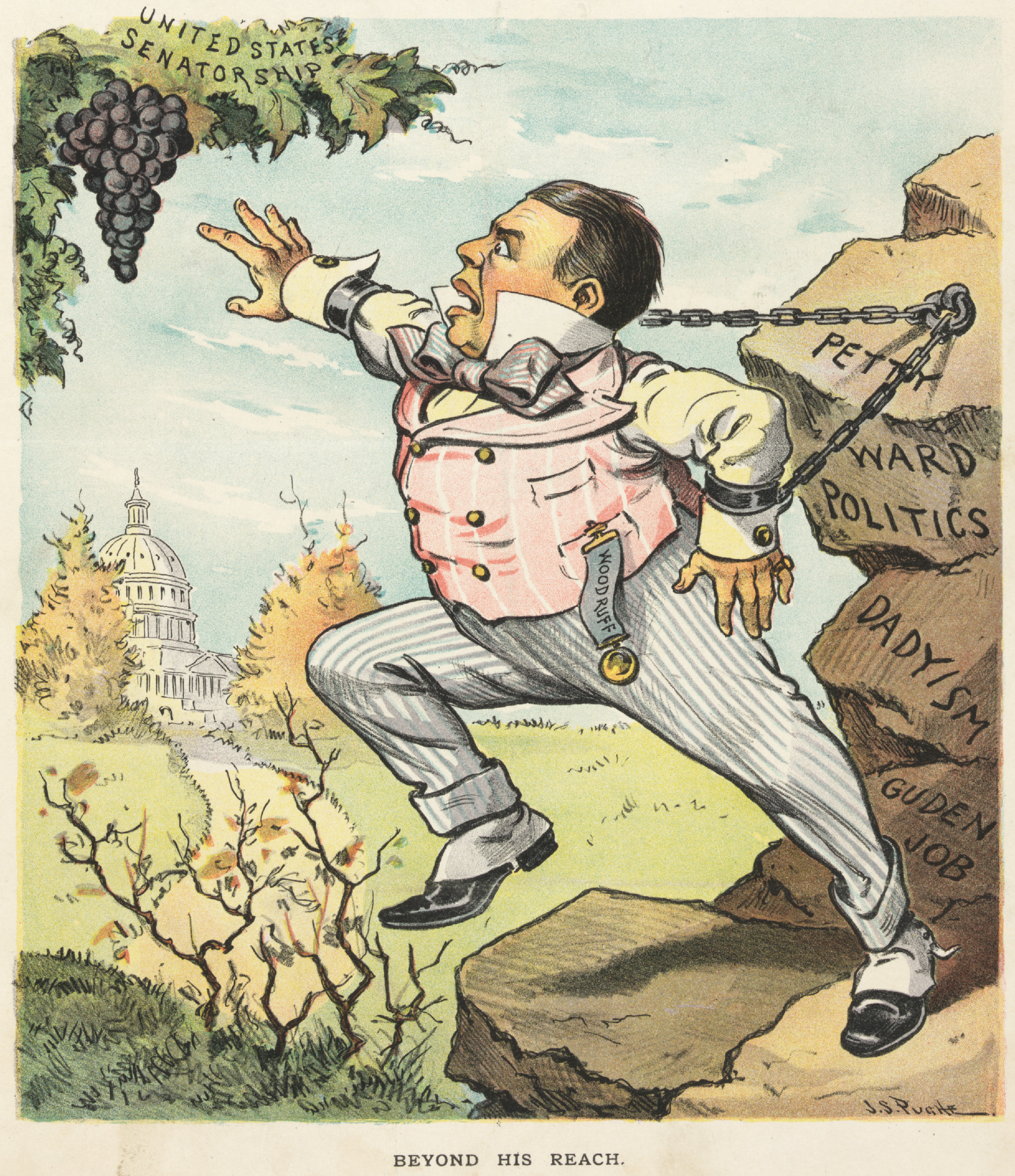
Woodruff

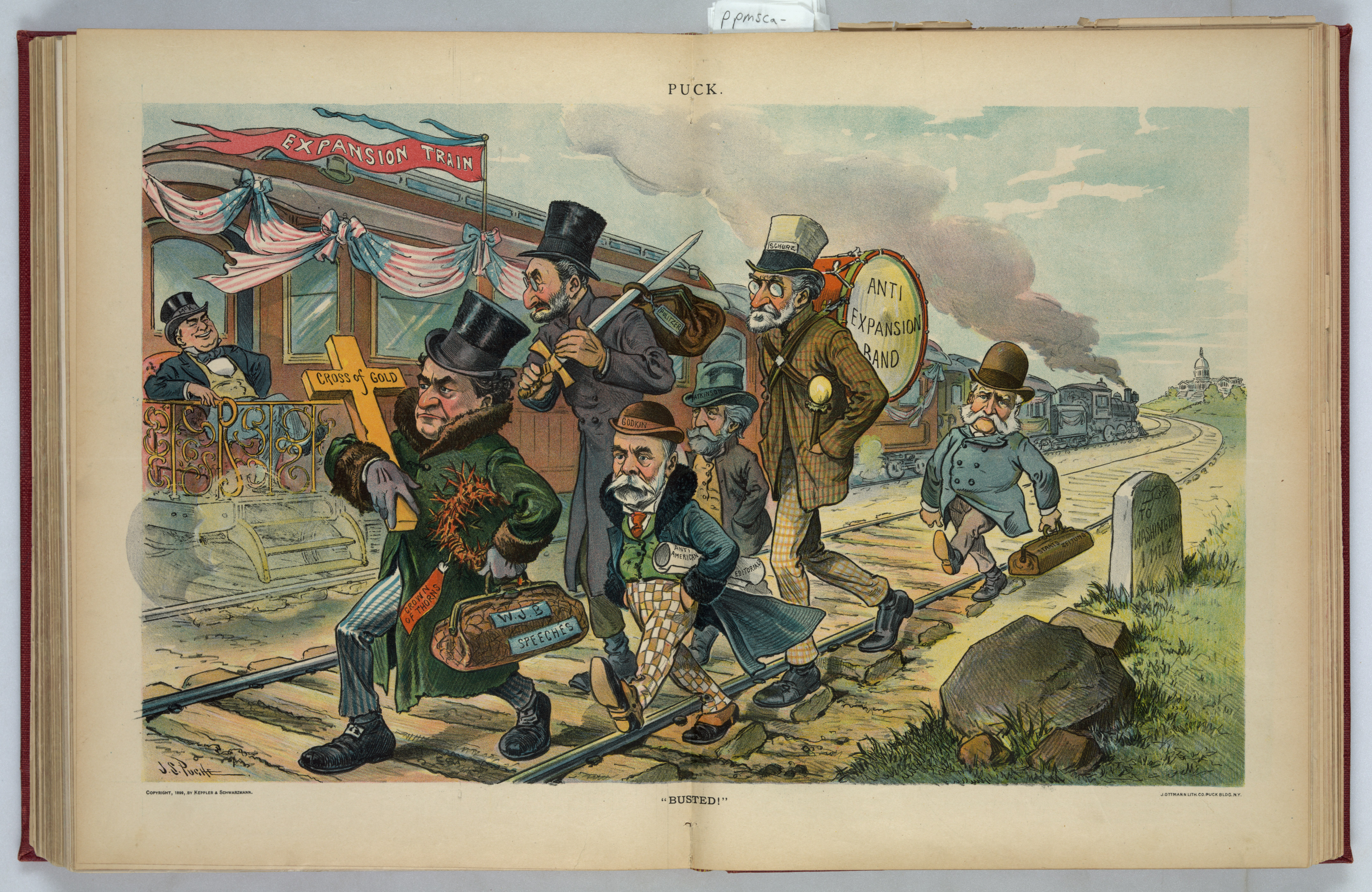
Busted

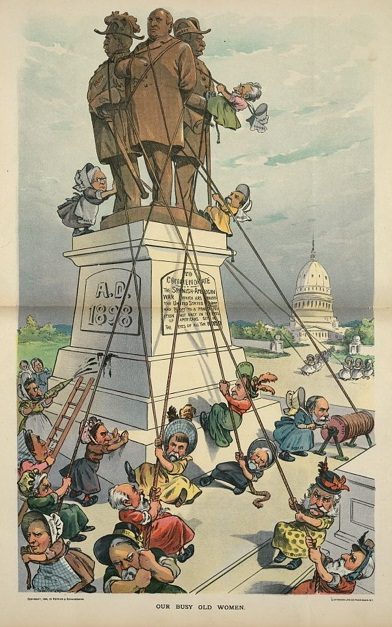
Our busy old women

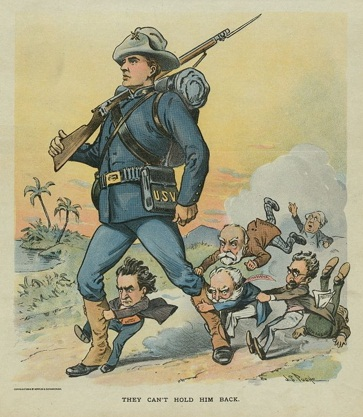
They can't hold him back

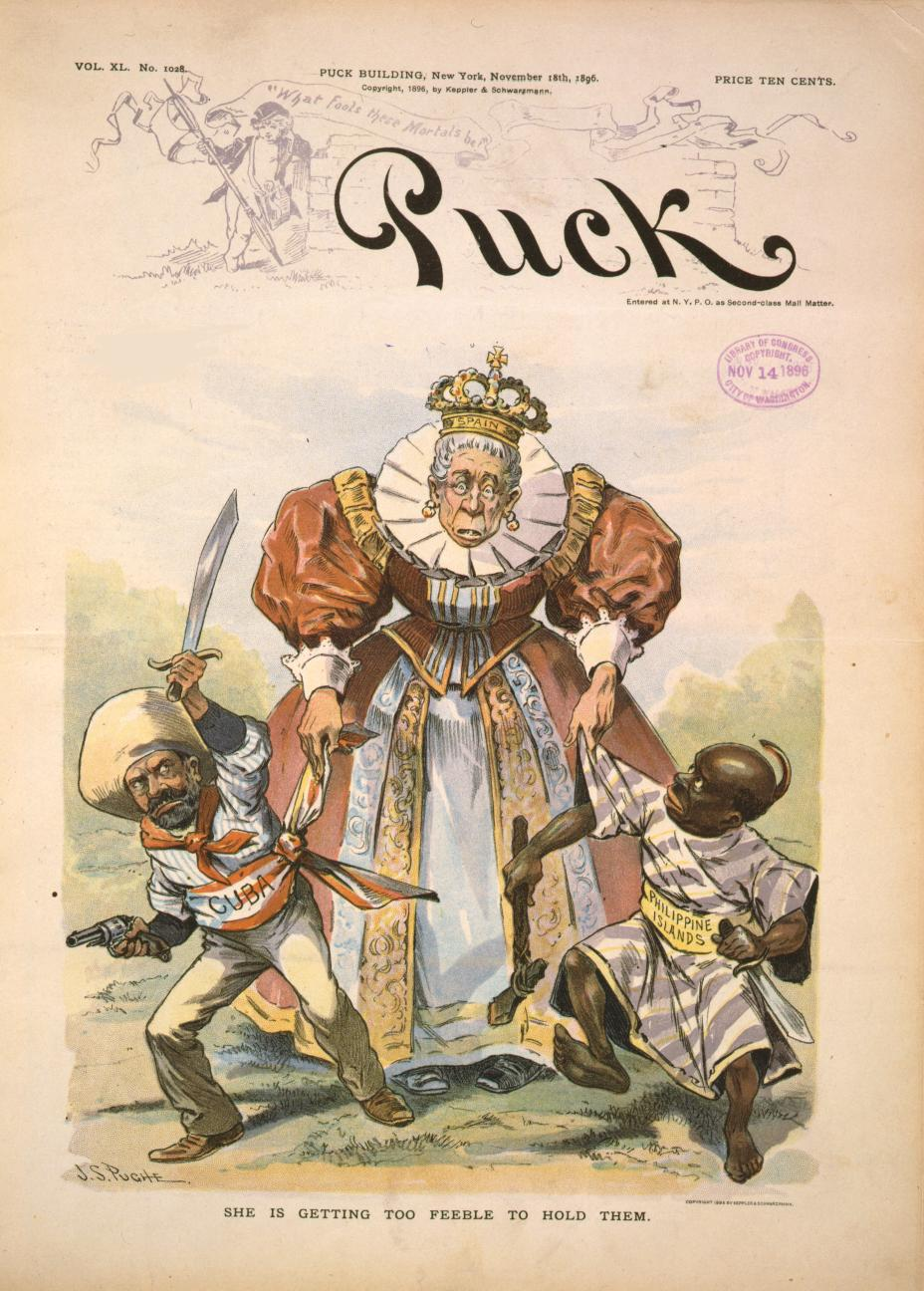
Puck 11-18-1896 cover

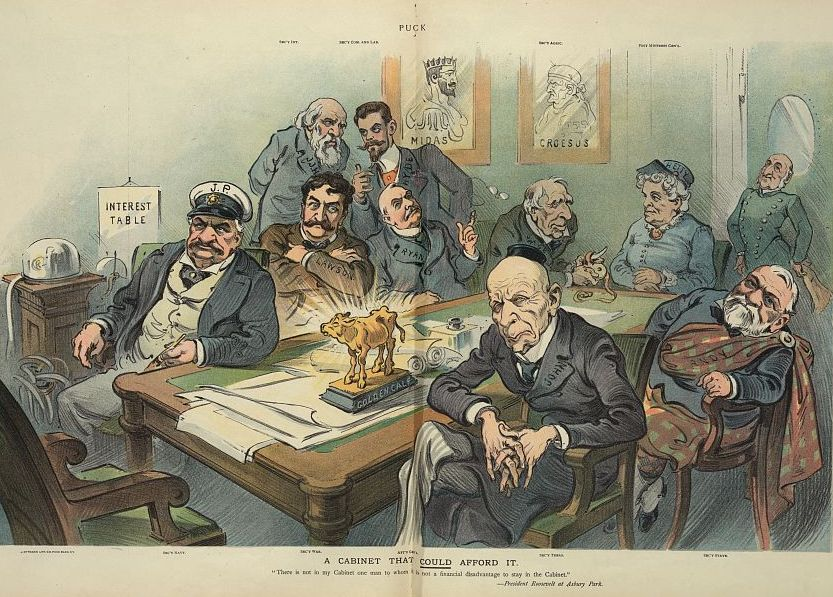
A cabinet that could afford it

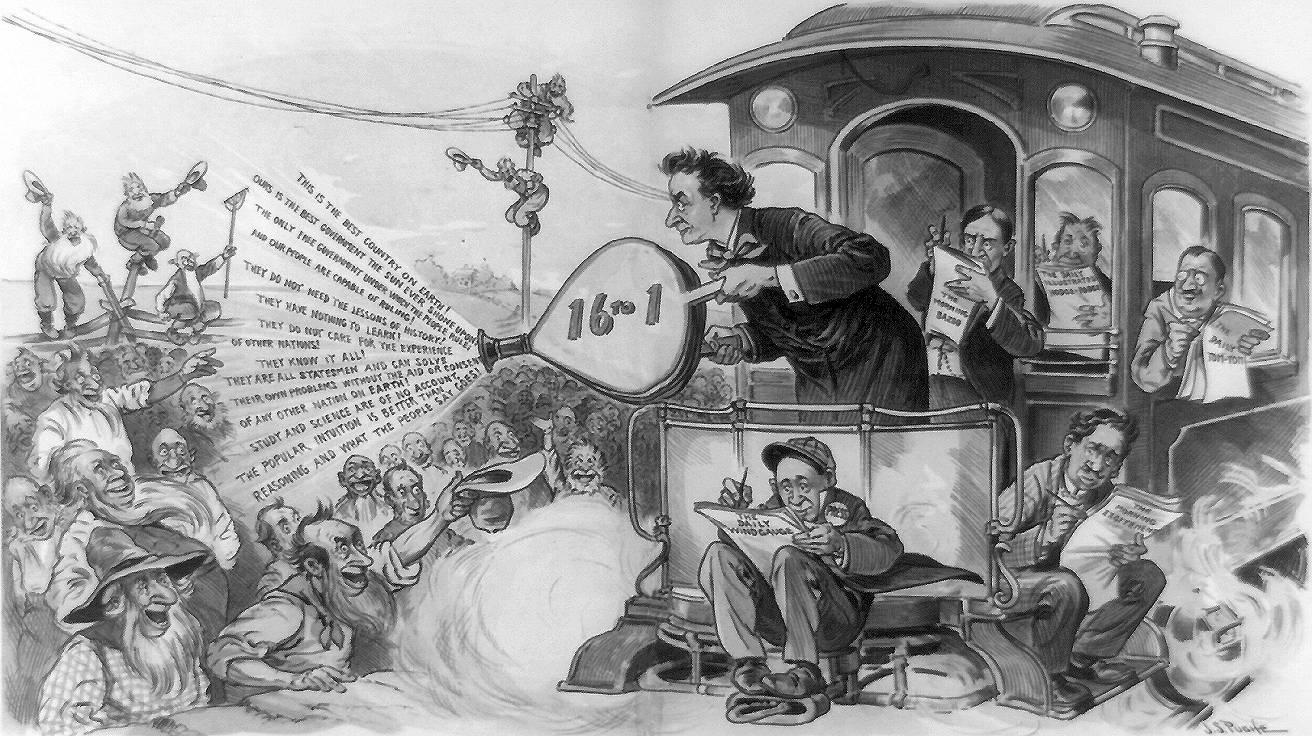
William Jennings Bryan's whistle-stop campaign
