= Nativism (politics) =

Policy of protecting the interests of established inhabitants against those of immigrants

Nativism is a political policy of promoting or protecting the interests of native-born or indigenous people over those of immigrants, including opposition to immigration.

== Definition ==
According to Cas Mudde, a University of Georgia professor, nativism is a largely American notion that is rarely debated in Western Europe or Canada; the word originated with mid-19th-century political parties in the United States, most notably the Know Nothing party, which saw Catholic immigration from nations such as Germany and Ireland as a serious threat to native-born Protestant Americans. In the United States, nativism does not refer to a movement led by Native Americans, also referred to as American Indians. Rather, it denotes a movement to protect the interests of people descended from the founding generations of the United States. In the 2020s the designation of "Heritage American" has been used to encompass people who can trace their roots to the American Civil War period or to when the United States was established, and are thus descended from the "founding stock" of the country; this designation has been described as a nativist concept. While it primarily refers to offspring of original American settlers of 17th-century Anglo-Protestant and later 18th-century Scotch-Irish descent who founded the United States, it can also include Indigenous Americans and descendants of slaves who have been present in the country since those times. However, according to some American proponents of nativism such as Matt Walsh, the fact that the United States was primarily founded by people of European descent grants them a superior claim over being native to the country, because before their arrival and effort the United States as such did not exist. The concept of "Heritage American" includes not just demographic heritage but also cultural and aesthetic values developed by the settlers which are considered as foundational to the Americana culture.

== Causes ==
According to Joel S. Fetzer, opposition to immigration commonly arises in many countries because of issues of national, cultural, and religious identity. The phenomenon has especially been studied in Australia, Canada, New Zealand, the United Kingdom, and the United States, as well as in continental Europe. Thus, nativism has become a general term for opposition to immigration which is based on fears that immigrants will "distort or spoil" existing cultural values. In situations where immigrants greatly outnumber the original inhabitants, nativists seek to prevent cultural change.

Beliefs that contribute to anti-immigration sentiment include:

- Economic
  - Employment: The belief that immigrants acquire jobs that would have otherwise been available to native citizens, limiting native employment, and the belief that immigrants also create a surplus of labor that results in lowered wages.
  - Government expense: The belief that immigrants do not pay enough taxes to cover the cost of the services they require.
  - Welfare: The belief that immigrants make heavy use of the social welfare systems.
  - Housing: The belief that immigrants reduce vacancies, causing rent increases.
- Cultural
  - Language: The belief that immigrants isolate themselves in their own communities and refuse to learn the local language.
  - Culture: The belief that immigrants will outnumber the native population and replace its culture with theirs.
  - Crime: The belief that immigrants are more prone to crime than the native population.
  - Patriotism: The belief that immigrants damage a nation's sense of community based on ethnicity and nationality.
- Environmental
  - Environment: The belief that immigrants increase the consumption of limited resources.
  - Overpopulation: The belief that immigration contributes to overpopulation.
- Decolonization: The belief that immigrants or their native descendants colonize (inhabit) land area independently in conflict with the interests of an exceptionally native population.

Hans-Georg Betz examines three facets of nativism: economic, welfare, and symbolic. Economic nativism preaches that good jobs ought to be reserved for native citizens. Welfare nativism insists that native citizens should have absolute priority in access to governmental benefits. Symbolic nativism calls on the society and government to defend and promote the nation's cultural heritage. Betz argues that economic and welfare themes were historically dominant, but that since the 1990s symbolic nativism has become the focus of radical right-wing populist mobilization.

== By country and region ==
=== Africa ===
==== South Africa ====
Anti-immigrant rhetoric and violence in South Africa notably surged in 2026, driven by civic groups and vigilante organizations demanding the immediate departure of foreign nationals from other African countries. More than 160,000 foreign nationals, primarily from neighbouring countries like Zimbabwe, Mozambique, and Malawi, were displaced or forced to flee due to safety concerns. Movement groups like Operation Dudula have blamed foreign workers for depressing wages and overwhelming public services.

Although since the Khosa Case (2004), in which the Constitutional Court of South Africa established it was illegal to exclude permanent residents from the social welfare system, researchers have found that that several municipalities still use citizenship as a precondition for accessing welfare services. In the City of Johannesburg, for example, such policy positions are argued to be informed by anti-foreigner sentiments. Oliver Fuo, a South African professor of law, argues:

South African Ministers and local government leaders have resorted to a nativistic discourse to address competition over limited welfare services and to shield themselves for the failures of the State to achieve the large-scale egalitarian transformation envisaged by the Constitution of the Republic of South Africa.

=== Asia-Pacific ===
==== Australia ====
Many Australians opposed the influx of Chinese immigrants at time of the nineteenth-century gold rushes. When the separate Australian colonies formed the Commonwealth of Australia in 1901, the new nation adopted "White Australia" as one of its founding principles. Under the White Australia policy, entry of Chinese and other Asians remained controversial until well after World War II, although the country remained home to many long-established Chinese families dating from before the adoption of White Australia. By contrast, most Pacific Islanders were deported soon after the policy was adopted, while the remainder were forced out of the canefields where they had worked for decades.

Antipathy of native white Australians toward British and Irish immigrants in the late 19th century was manifested in a new party, the Australian Natives' Association.

Since early 2000, opposition has mounted to asylum seekers arriving in boats from Indonesia.

==== Pakistan ====
The Pakistani province of Sindh has seen nativist movements, promoting control for the Sindhi people over their homeland. After the 1947 Partition of India, large numbers of Muhajir people migrating from India entered the province, becoming a majority in the provincial capital city of Karachi, which formerly had an ethnically Sindhi majority. Sindhis have also voiced opposition to the promotion of Urdu, as opposed to their native tongue, Sindhi.

These nativist movements are expressed through Sindhi nationalism and the Sindhudesh separatist movement. Nativist and nationalist sentiments increased greatly after the independence of Bangladesh from Pakistan in 1971.

==== Taiwan ====
Taiwan nativist literature (鄉土文學) is a genre of Taiwanese literature that was born in the 1920s, the Taiwan under Japanese rule. Taiwan nativist literature was suppressed by the rise of Japanese fascism in 1937, and after the surrender of Japan, it was suppressed by the White Terror of the Chinese Nationalist Party (Kuomintang) and began to gain attention again in the 1970s.

After the Chinese Civil War, Taiwan became a sanctuary for Chinese nationalists who followed a Western ideology, fleeing from communists. The new arrivals governed through the Kuomintang until the 1970s. Taiwanese identity constructed through literature in the post-civil war period led to the gradual acceptance of Taiwan's unique political destiny. This led to a peaceful transition of power from the Kuomintang to the Democratic Progressive Party in the 2000s. A-chin Hsiau (Author of Politics and Cultural Nativism) claims the origins of Taiwanese national identity to the 1970s, when youth activism transformed society, politics and culture which some are still present.

=== Americas ===
==== Brazil ====
The Brazilian elite desired the racial whitening of the country, similarly to Argentina and Uruguay. The country encouraged European immigration, but non-white immigration always faced considerable backlash. On 28 July 1921, representatives Andrade Bezerra and Cincinato Braga proposed a law whose Article 1 provided: "The immigration of individuals from the black race to Brazil is prohibited." On 22 October 1923, representative Fidélis Reis produced another bill on the entry of immigrants, whose fifth article was as follows: "The entry of settlers from the black race into Brazil is prohibited. For Asian [immigrants] there will be allowed each year a number equal to 5% of those residing in the country.(...)".

In the 19th and 20th centuries, there were negative feelings toward the communities of German, Italian, Japanese, and Jewish immigrants, who preserved their languages and cultures instead of adopting Portuguese and Brazilian habits. (Today, Brazil has the highest number of Venetian-speaking communities in the Americas, and the second-highest number of German-speaking communities.) They were seen as particularly likely to form ghettos and to have high rates of endogamy—in Brazil, it is regarded as usual for people of different backgrounds to marry—among other concerns.

It affected the Japanese more harshly because they were Asian, and thus seen as an obstacle to the whitening of Brazil. Oliveira Viana, a Brazilian jurist, historian and sociologist, described Japanese immigrants as follows: "They (Japanese) are like sulfur: insoluble". The Brazilian magazine O Malho, in its December 5, 1908 issue, criticised Japanese immigrants with the following quote: "The government of São Paulo is stubborn. After the failure of the first Japanese immigration, it contracted 3,000 yellow people. It insists on giving Brazil a race diametrically opposite to ours". In 1941 the Brazilian minister of justice, Francisco Campos, defended the ban on the admission of 400 Japanese immigrants into São Paulo writing: "their despicable standard of living is a brutal competition with the country's worker; their selfishness, their bad faith, their refractory character, make them a huge ethnic and cultural cyst located in the richest regions of Brazil".

Years before World War II, the government of President Getúlio Vargas initiated a process of forced assimilation of people of immigrant origin in Brazil. In 1933, a constitutional amendment was approved by a large majority and established immigration quotas without mentioning race or nationality and prohibited the population concentration of immigrants. According to the text, Brazil could not receive more than 2% of the total number of entrants of each nationality that had been received in the last 50 years. Only the Portuguese were excluded. The measures did not affect the immigration of Europeans such as Italians and Spaniards, who had already entered in large numbers and whose migratory flow was downward. However, immigration quotas, which remained in force until the 1980s, restricted Japanese immigration, as well as Korean and Chinese immigration.

During World War II, they were seen as more loyal to their countries of origin than to Brazil. In fact, there were violent revolts in the Japanese community of the states of São Paulo and Paraná when Emperor Hirohito declared Japanese surrender and stated that he was not really a deity, which was seen as a conspiracy perpetrated in order to hurt Japanese honour and strength. Nevertheless, it followed hostility from the government. The Japanese Brazilian community was strongly marked by restrictive measures when Brazil declared war against Japan in August 1942. Japanese Brazilians could not travel the country without safe conduct issued by the police; over 200 Japanese schools were closed and radio equipment was seized to prevent transmissions on short wave from Japan. The goods of Japanese companies were confiscated and several companies of Japanese origin suffered restrictions, including the use of the newly founded Banco América do Sul. Japanese Brazilians were prohibited from driving motor vehicles (even if they were taxi drivers), buses or trucks on their property. The drivers employed by Japanese had to have permission from the police. Thousands of Japanese immigrants were arrested or expelled from Brazil on suspicion of espionage. There were many anonymous denunciations because of "activities against national security" arising from disagreements between neighbours, recovery of debts and even fights between children. Japanese Brazilians were arrested for "suspicious activity" when they were in artistic meetings or picnics. On July 10, 1943, approximately 10,000 Japanese and German immigrants who lived in Santos had 24 hours to close their homes and businesses and move away from the Brazilian coast. The police acted without any notice. About 90% of people displaced were Japanese. To reside in Baixada Santista, the Japanese had to have a safe conduct. In 1942, the Japanese community who introduced the cultivation of pepper in Tomé-Açu, in Pará, was virtually turned into a "concentration camp" (expression of the time) from which no Japanese could leave. This time, the Brazilian ambassador in Washington, D.C., Carlos Martins Pereira e Sousa, encouraged the government of Brazil to transfer all the Japanese Brazilians to "internment camps" without the need for legal support, in the same manner as was done with the Japanese residents in the United States. No single suspicion of activities of Japanese against "national security" was confirmed.

Nowadays, nativism in Brazil affects primarily migrants from elsewhere in the Third World, such as the new wave of Levantine Arabs (this time, mostly Muslims from Palestine instead of overwhelmingly Christian from Syria and Lebanon), South and East Asians (primarily Mainland Chinese), Spanish-speakers and Amerindians from neighbouring South American countries and, especially, West Africans and Haitians. Following the 2010 Haiti earthquake and considerable illegal immigration to northern Brazil and São Paulo, a subsequent debate in the population was concerned with the reasons why Brazil has such lax laws and enforcement concerning illegal immigration.

According to the 1988 Brazilian Constitution, it is an unbailable crime to address someone in an offensive racist way, and it is illegal to discriminate against someone on the basis of his or her race, skin colour, national or regional origin or nationality; thus, the topics of nativism and opposition to multiculturalism would be too polemical and delicate to be openly discussed as a basic ideology for even the most right-leaning modern political parties.

==== Canada ====
Throughout the 19th century, well into the 20th, the Orange Order in Canada attacked and tried to politically defeat the Irish Catholics. In the British Empire, traditions of anti-Catholicism in Britain led to fears that Catholics were a threat to the national (British) values. In Canada, the Orange Order campaigned vigorously against the Catholics throughout the 19th century, often with violent confrontations. Both sides were immigrants from Ireland and neither side claimed loyalty to Canada.

The Ku Klux Klan spread in the mid-1920s from the U.S. to parts of Canada, especially Saskatchewan, where it helped topple the Liberal government. The Klan creed was, historian Martin Robin argues, in the mainstream of Protestant Canadian sentiment, for it was based on "Protestantism, separation of Church and State, pure patriotism, restrictive and selective immigration, one national public school, one flag and one language—English."

In World War I, Canadian naturalized citizens of German or Austrian origins were stripped of their right to vote, and tens of thousands of Ukrainians (who were born in the Austro-Hungarian Empire) were rounded up and put in internment camps.

Hostility to the Chinese and other Asians was intense, and involved provincial laws that hindered immigration of Chinese and Japanese and blocked their economic mobility. In 1942 Japanese Canadians were forced into detention camps in response to Japanese aggression in World War II.

Hostility of native-born Canadians to competition from English immigrants in the early 20th century was expressed in signs that read, "No English Need Apply!" The resentment came because the immigrants identified more with England than with Canada.

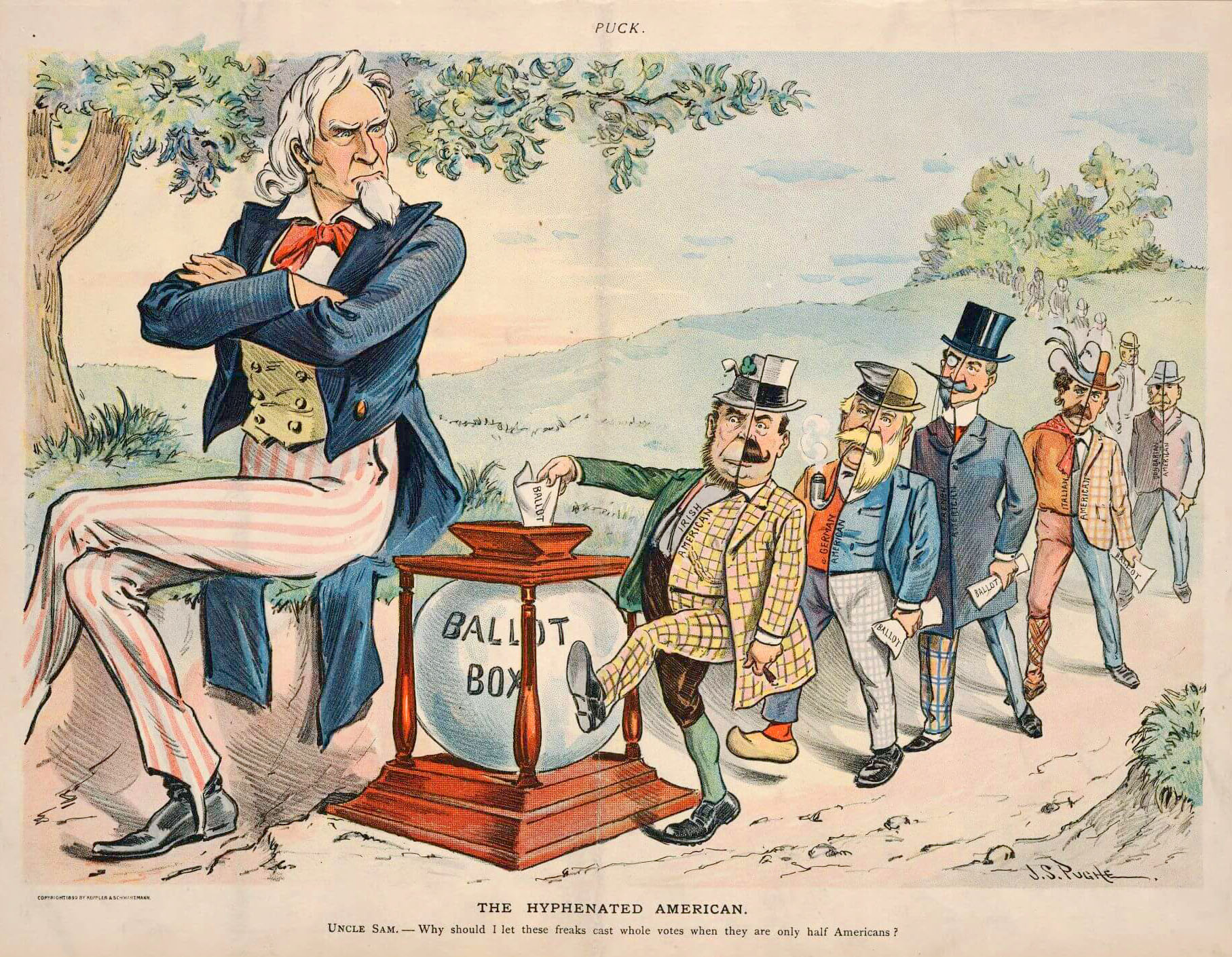
Cartoon from Puck, August 9, 1899, by J. S. Pughe. Angry Uncle Sam sees hyphenated voters (including an Irish-American, a German-American, a French-American, an Italian-American, and a Hungarian-American) and demands, "Why should I let these freaks cast whole votes when they are only half Americans?"

==== United States ====
According to the American historian John Higham, nativism is:

an intense opposition to an internal minority on the grounds of its foreign (i.e., "un-American") connections. Specific nativist antagonisms may and do, vary widely in response to the changing character of minority irritants and the shifting conditions of the day; but through each separate hostility runs the connecting, energizing force of modern nationalism. While drawing on much broader cultural antipathies and ethnocentric judgments, nativism translates them into zeal to destroy the enemies of a distinctively American way of life.

===== Colonial era =====
There was nativism in the colonial era shown by English colonists (who comprised most of the 17th century primary settlers) against the Palatine German immigrants in the Pennsylvania Colony. Benjamin Franklin questioned about allowing Palatine refugees to settle in Pennsylvania. He was concerned about the potential consequences of their arrival, particularly regarding the preservation of Pennsylvania's English identity and heritage. He questioned whether it was prudent for a colony established by English settlers to be overwhelmed by newcomers who might not integrate into English culture and language.

===== Early republic =====
Nativism was a political factor in the 1790s and in the 1830s–1850s. Nativism became a major issue in the late 1790s, when the Federalist Party expressed its strong opposition to the French Revolution by trying to strictly limit immigration, and stretching the time to 14 years for citizenship. At the time of the Quasi-War with the French First Republic in 1798, the Federalists and Congress passed the Alien and Sedition Acts, including the Alien Act, the Naturalization Act and the Sedition Act. Thomas Jefferson and James Madison fought against the new laws by drafting the Virginia and Kentucky Resolutions. In 1800, Jefferson was elected president, and removed most of the anti-immigrant legislation.

===== 1830–1860 =====
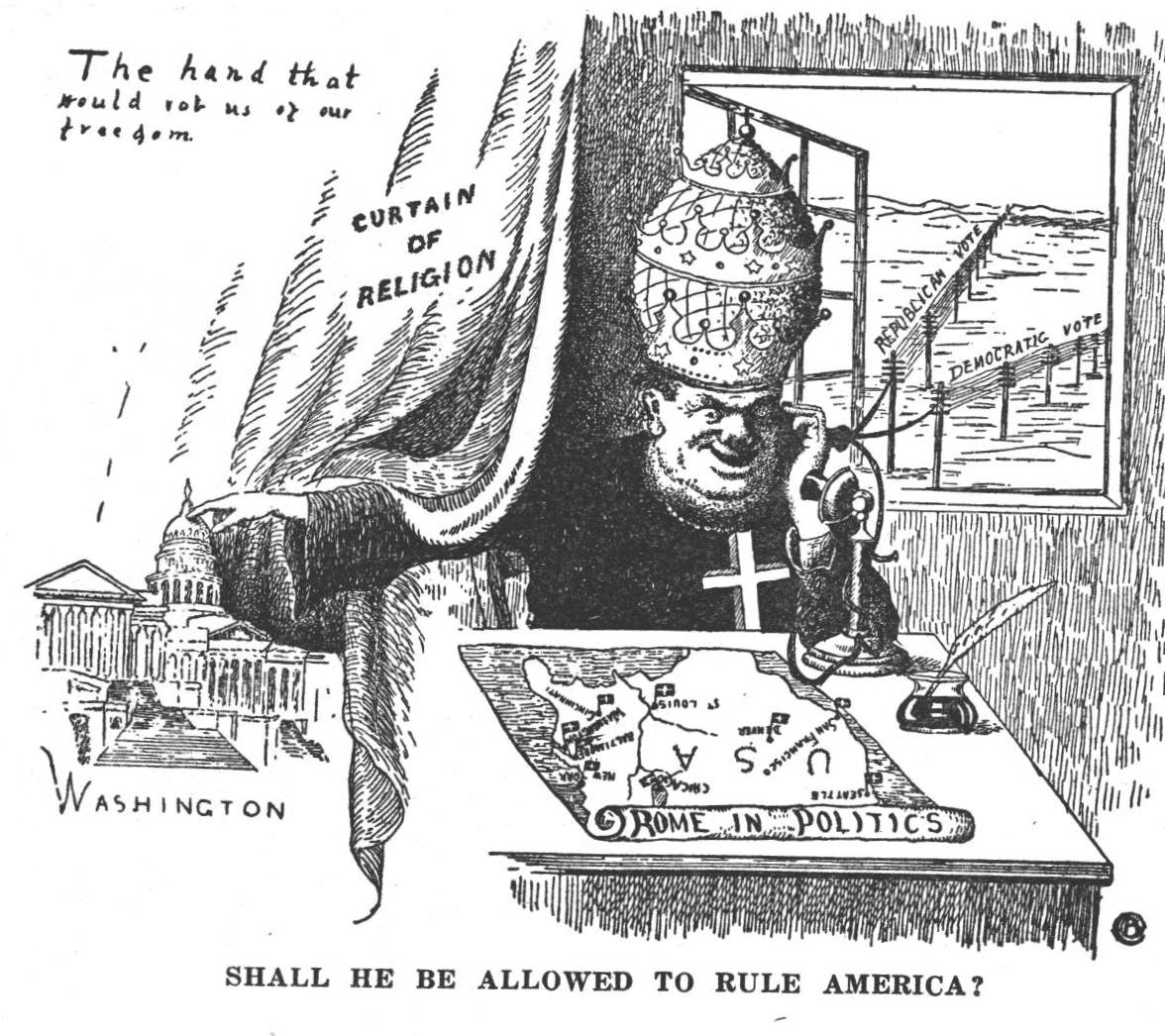
Guardians of Liberty, an anti-Catholic caricature by the Ku Klux Klan-affiliate Alma White (1943), founder and bishop of the Pillar of Fire Church

The term nativism was first used by 1844: "Thousands were Naturalized expressly to oppose Nativism, and voted the Polk ticket mainly to that end." Nativism gained its name from the "Native American" parties of the 1840s and 1850s. In this context, native does not mean American Indians but rather native descendants of the inhabitants of the original Thirteen Colonies. It impacted politics in the mid-19th century because of the large inflows of immigrants after 1845 from cultures that were different from the existing American culture. Nativists objected primarily to Germans, and to the Irish Roman Catholics because of their loyalty to the Pope and also because of their supposed rejection of republicanism as an American ideal.

Under the Polk administration, "nativism was flourishing in the United States, and immigrants, especially Germans, had to suffer many indignities." While the U.S. military was expanding under the President's policy of Manifest Destiny and the Mexican War in 1846, the military became a refuge from nativism, ignoring it altogether. Nearly half of the 30,000 men in the regular army, and a good portion of the 74,000 volunteers were immigrants, mostly Irish and German.

Nativist movements included the Know Nothing or "American Party" of the 1850s, the Immigration Restriction League of the 1890s, the anti-Asian movements in the Western states, resulting in the Chinese Exclusion Act of 1882 and the "Gentlemen's Agreement of 1907", by which the government of Imperial Japan stopped emigration to the United States. Labor unions were strong supporters of Chinese exclusion and limits on immigration, because of fears that they would lower wages and make it harder for workers to organize unions.

Nativist outbursts occurred in the Northeast from the 1830s to the 1850s, primarily in response to a surge of Irish Catholic immigration. In 1836, Samuel Morse ran unsuccessfully for Mayor of New York City on a nativist ticket, receiving 1,496 votes. In New York City, an Order of United Americans was founded as a nativist fraternity, following the Philadelphia Nativist Riots of the preceding spring and summer, in December 1844. The American historian Eric Kaufmann has suggested that American nativism has been explained primarily in psychological and economic terms due to the neglect of a crucial cultural and ethnic dimension. Furthermore, Kauffman claims that American nativism cannot be understood without reference to an American ethnic group which took shape prior to the large-scale immigration of the mid-19th century.

The nativists went public in 1854 when they formed the "American Party", which was especially hostile to the immigration of Irish Catholics, and campaigned for laws to require longer wait time between immigration and naturalization; these laws never passed. It was at this time that the term "nativist" first appeared, as their opponents denounced them as "bigoted nativists". Former President Millard Fillmore ran on the American Party ticket for the presidency in 1856. Henry Winter Davis, an active Know-Nothing, was elected on the American Party ticket to Congress from Maryland. He told Congress the un-American Irish Catholic immigrants were to blame for the recent election of Democrat James Buchanan as president, stating:

The recent election has developed in an aggravated form every evil against which the American party protested. Foreign allies have decided the government of the country -- men naturalized in thousands on the eve of the election. Again in the fierce struggle for supremacy, men have forgotten the ban which the Republic puts on the intrusion of religious influence on the political arena. These influences have brought vast multitudes of foreign-born citizens to the polls, ignorant of American interests, without American feelings, influenced by foreign sympathies, to vote on American affairs; and those votes have, in point of fact, accomplished the present result.

The American Party also included many former Whigs who ignored nativism, and included (in the South) a few Roman Catholics whose families had long lived in North America. Conversely, much of the opposition to Roman Catholics came from Protestant Irish immigrants and German Lutheran immigrants, who were not native at all and can hardly be called "nativists."

This form of American nationalism is often identified with xenophobia and anti-Catholic sentiment. In Charlestown, Massachusetts, a nativist mob attacked and burned down a Roman Catholic convent in 1834 (no one was injured). In the 1840s, small scale riots between Roman Catholics and nativists took place in several American cities. In Philadelphia, Pennsylvania in 1844, for example, a series of nativist assaults on Roman Catholic churches and community centers resulted in the loss of lives and the professionalization of the police force. In Louisville, Kentucky, election-day rioters killed at least 22 people in attacks on German and Irish Catholics on 6 August 1855, in what became known as "Bloody Monday."

The new Republican Party kept its nativist element quiet during the 1860s, since immigrants were urgently needed for the Union Army. European immigrants from England, Scotland, and Scandinavia favored the Republicans during the Third Party System (1854–1896), while others especially Irish Catholics and Germans, were usually Democratic. Hostility toward Asians was very strong in the Western region from the 1860s to the 1940s. Anti-Catholicism experienced a revival in the 1890s in the American Protective Association. It was led by Protestant Irish immigrants hostile to the Irish Catholics.

===== Anti-German nativism =====
From the 1840s to the 1920s, German Americans were often distrusted because of their separatist social structure, their German-language schools, their attachment to their native tongue over English, and their neutrality during World War I.

The Bennett Law caused a political uproar in Wisconsin in 1890, as the state government passed a law that threatened to close down hundreds of German-language elementary schools. Catholic and Lutheran Germans rallied to defeat Governor William D. Hoard. Hoard attacked German American culture and religion:

"We must fight alienism and selfish ecclesiasticism.... The parents, the pastors and the church have entered into a conspiracy to darken the understanding of the children, who are denied by cupidity and bigotry the privilege of even the free schools of the state."

Hoard, a Republican, was defeated by the Democrats. A similar campaign in Illinois regarding the "Edwards Law" led to a Republican defeat there in 1890.

In 1917–1918, a wave of nativist sentiment due to American entry into World War I led to the suppression of German cultural activities in the United States, Canada, and Australia. There was little violence, but many places and streets had their names changed (The city of "Berlin" in Ontario was renamed "Kitchener" after a British hero), churches switched to English for their services, and German Americans were forced to buy war bonds to show their patriotism. In Australia thousands of Germans were put into internment camps.

===== Anti-Chinese nativism =====
In the 1870s and 1880s in the Western states, ethnic White immigrants, especially Irish Americans and German Americans, targeted violence against Chinese workers, driving them out of smaller towns. Denis Kearney, an immigrant from Ireland, led a mass movement in San Francisco in the 1870s that incited attacks on the Chinese there and threatened public officials and railroad owners. The Chinese Exclusion Act of 1882 was the first of many nativist acts of Congress which attempted to limit the flow of immigrants into the U.S.. The Chinese responded to it by filing false claims of American birth, enabling thousands of them to immigrate to California. The exclusion of the Chinese caused the western railroads to begin importing Mexican railroad workers in greater numbers ("traqueros").

===== 20th century =====
In the 1890s–1920s era, nativists and labor unions campaigned for immigration restriction following the waves of workers and families from Southern and Eastern Europe, including the Kingdom of Italy, the Balkans, Congress Poland, Austria-Hungary, and the Russian Empire. A favorite plan was the literacy test to exclude workers who could not read or write their own foreign language. Congress passed literacy tests, but presidents—responding to business needs for workers—vetoed them. Senator Henry Cabot Lodge argued the need for literacy tests, and described its implication on the new immigrants:

It is found, in the first place, that the illiteracy test will bear most heavily upon the Italians, Russians, Poles, Hungarians, Greeks, and Asiatics, and lightly, or not at all, upon English-speaking emigrants, or Germans, Scandinavians, and French. In other words, the races most affected by the illiteracy test are those whose emigration to this country has begun within the last twenty years and swelled rapidly to enormous proportions, races with which the English speaking people have never hitherto assimilated, and who are most alien to the great body of the people of the United States.

Responding to these demands, opponents of the literacy test called for the establishment of an immigration commission to focus on immigration as a whole. The United States Immigration Commission, also known as the Dillingham Commission, was created and tasked with studying immigration and its effect on the United States. The findings of the commission further influenced immigration policy and upheld the concerns of the nativist movement. Following World War I, nativists in the 1920s focused their attention on Southern and Eastern Europeans due to their Roman Catholic and Jewish faith, and realigned their beliefs behind racial and religious nativism.

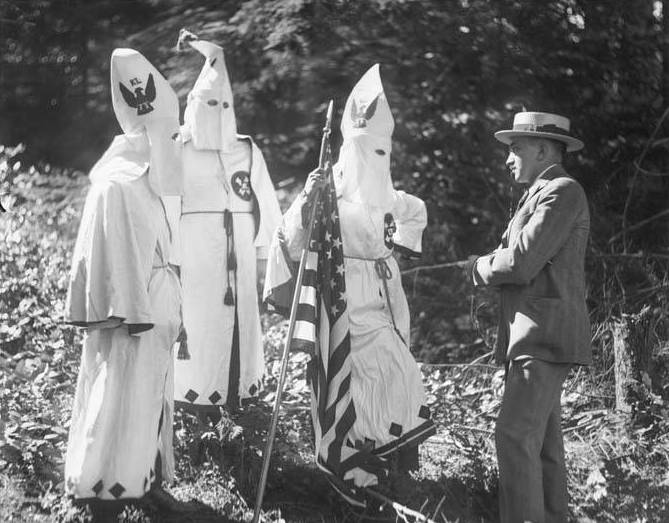
Three Klansmen talking to PI reporter Robert Berman in Seattle, Washington (circa 1923). Photograph currently preserved by the Museum of History & Industry.

Between the 1920s and the 1930s, the Ku Klux Klan developed an explicitly nativist, pro-Anglo-Saxon Protestant, anti-Catholic, anti-Irish, anti-Italian, and anti-Jewish stance in relation to the growing political, economic, and social uncertainty related to the arrival of European immigrants on the American soil, predominantly composed of Irish people, Italians, and Eastern European Jews. The racial concern of the anti-immigration movement was linked closely to the eugenics movement that was sweeping in the United States during the same period. Led by Madison Grant's book, The Passing of the Great Race nativists grew more concerned with the racial purity of the United States. In his book, Grant argued that the American racial stock was being diluted by the influx of new immigrants from the Mediterranean, Ireland, the Balkans, and the ghettos. The Passing of the Great Race reached wide popularity among Americans and influenced immigration policy in the 1920s. In the 1920s, a wide national consensus sharply restricted the overall inflow of immigrants from southern and eastern Europe. The Second Ku Klux Klan, which flourished in the United States during the 1920s, used strong nativist, anti-Catholic, and anti-Jewish rhetoric, but the Catholics led a counterattack, such as in Chicago in 1921, where ethnic Irish residents hanged a Klan member in front of 3,000 people.

After intense lobbying from the nativist movement, the United States Congress passed the Emergency Quota Act in 1921. This bill was the first to place numerical quotas on immigration. It capped the inflow of immigrations to 357,803 for those arriving outside of the western hemisphere. However, this bill was only temporary, as Congress began debating a more permanent bill. The Emergency Quota Act was followed with the Immigration Act of 1924, a more permanent resolution. This law reduced the number of immigrants able to arrive from 357,803, the number established in the Emergency Quota Act, to 164,687. Though this bill did not fully restrict immigration, it considerably curbed the flow of immigration into the United States, especially from Southern and Eastern Europe. During the late 1920s, an average of 270,000 immigrants were allowed to arrive, mainly because of the exemption of Canada and Latin American countries. Fear of low-skilled Southern and Eastern European immigrants flooding the labor market was an issue in the 1920s, the 1930s, and the first decade of the 21st century (focused on immigrants from Mexico and Central America).

An immigration reductionism movement formed in the 1970s and continues to the present day. Prominent members often press for massive, sometimes total, reductions in immigration levels. American nativist sentiment experienced a resurgence in the late 20th century, this time directed at undocumented workers, largely Mexican, resulting in the passage of new penalties against illegal immigration in 1996. Most immigration reductionists see illegal immigration, principally from across the United States–Mexico border, as the more pressing concern. Authors such as Samuel Huntington have also seen recent Hispanic immigration as creating a national identity crisis and presenting insurmountable problems for US social institutions.

Despite some Mexicans being descended from people indigenous to the region, when noting Mexican immigration in the Southwest, the European-American Cold-War diplomat George F. Kennan wrote in 2002 he saw "unmistakable evidences of a growing differentiation between the cultures, respectively, of large southern and southwestern regions of this country, on the one hand", and those of "some northern regions". In the former, he warned:

the very culture of the bulk of the population of these regions will tend to be primarily Latin-American in nature rather than what is inherited from earlier American traditions ... Could it really be that there was so little of merit [in America] that it deserves to be recklessly trashed in favor of a polyglot mix-mash?"

David Mayers argues that Kennan represented the "tradition of militant nativism" that resembled or even exceeded the Know Nothings of the 1850s.

===== 21st century =====
By late 2014, the "Tea Party movement" had turned its focus away from economic issues, spending, and Obamacare, and towards President Barack Obama's immigration policies, which it saw as a threat to transform American society. It planned to defeat leading Republicans who supported immigration programs, such as Senator John McCain. A typical slogan appeared in the Tea Party Tribune: "Amnesty for Millions, Tyranny for All." The New York Times reported:

What started five years ago as a groundswell of conservatives committed to curtailing the reach of the federal government, cutting the deficit and countering the Wall Street wing of the Republican Party has become a movement largely against immigration overhaul. The politicians, intellectual leaders and activists who consider themselves part of the Tea Party have redirected their energy from fiscal austerity and small government to stopping any changes that would legitimize people who are here illegally, either through granting them citizenship or legal status.

Political scientist and pollster Darrell Bricker, CEO of Ipsos Public Affairs, argues nativism is the root cause of the early 21st century wave of populism.

[T]he jet fuel that’s really feeding the populist firestorm is nativism, the strong belief among an electorally important segment of the population that governments and other institutions should honour and protect the interests of their native-born citizens against the cultural changes being brought about by immigration. This, according to the populists, is about protecting the "Real America" (or "Real Britain" or "Real Poland" or "Real France" or "Real Hungary") from imported influences that are destroying the values and cultures that have made their countries great.

Importantly, it’s not just the nativists who are saying this is a battle over values and culture. Their strongest opponents believe this too, and they are not prepared to concede the high ground on what constitutes a "real citizen" to the populists. For them, this is a battle about the rule of law, inclusiveness, open borders, and global participation.

In his 2016 bid for the presidency, Republican presidential candidate Donald Trump was accused of introducing nativist themes via his controversial stances on temporarily banning foreign Muslims from six specific countries entering the United States, and erecting a substantial wall between the US-Mexico border to halt illegal immigration. Journalist John Cassidy wrote in The New Yorker that Trump was transforming the GOP into a populist, nativist party:

Trump has been drawing on a base of alienated white working-class and middle-class voters, seeking to remake the G.O.P. into a more populist, nativist, avowedly protectionist, and semi-isolationist party that is skeptical of immigration, free trade, and military interventionism.

Donald Brand, a professor of political science, argues:

Donald Trump's nativism is a fundamental corruption of the founding principles of the Republican Party. Nativists champion the purported interests of American citizens over those of immigrants, justifying their hostility to immigrants by the use of derogatory stereotypes: Mexicans are rapists; Muslims are terrorists.

===== Language =====
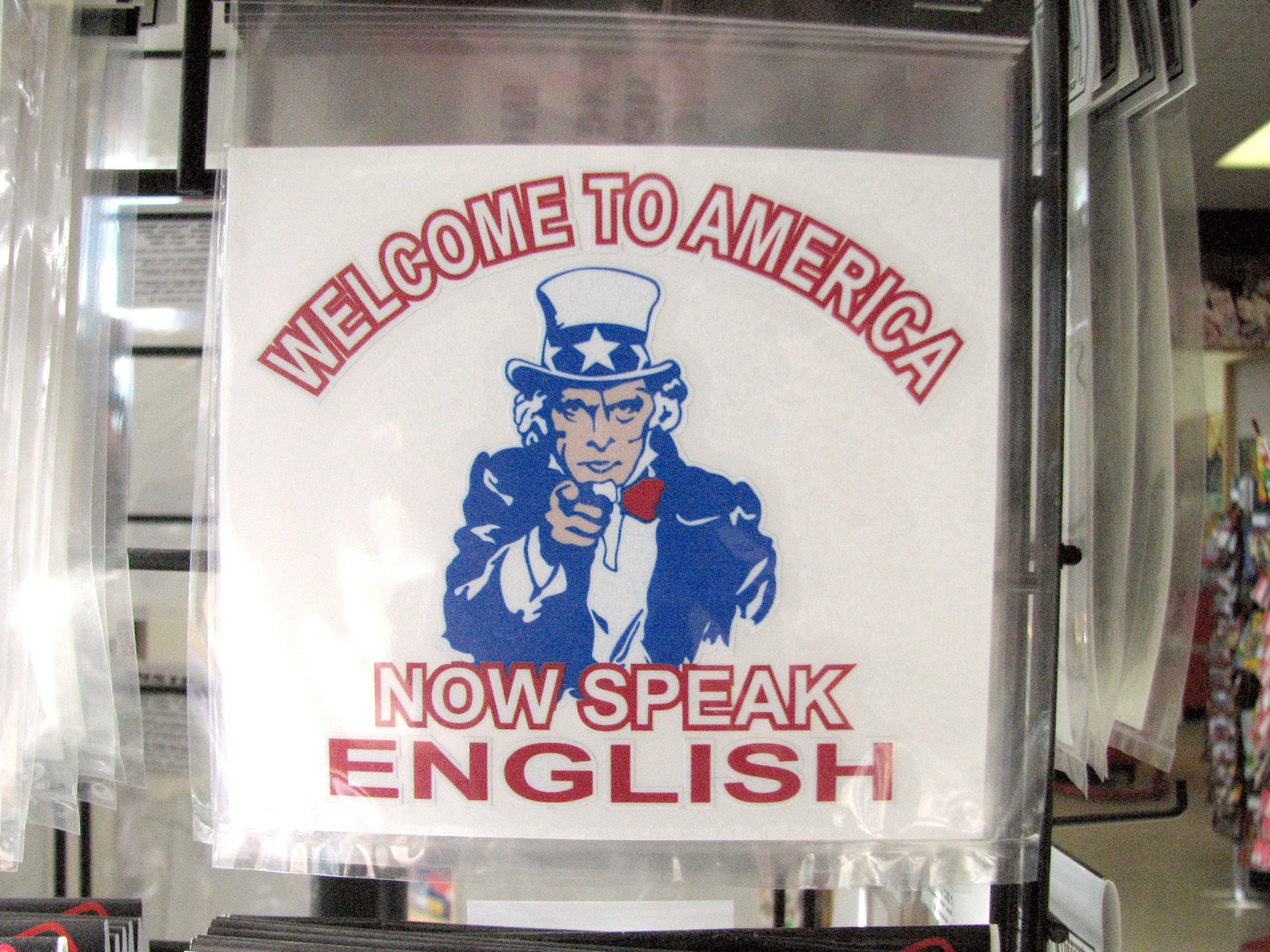
Sticker sold in Colorado

American nativists have promoted English and deprecated the use of German and Spanish. English Only proponents in the late 20th century proposed an English Language Amendment (ELA), a constitutional amendment making English the official language of the United States, but it received limited political support.

=== Europe ===
Following the post-1950s wave of immigration in Europe, nativism was perceived to rise. They debate the role of cultural differences, ghettos, race, Muslim fundamentalism, poor education and poverty play in creating nativism among the hosts and a caste-type underclass, more similar to white-black tensions in the US. Sociologists Josip Kešić and Jan Willem Duyvendak define nativism as an intense opposition to an internal minority that is portrayed as a threat to the nation because of its different values and priorities. There are three subtypes: secularist nativism; racial nativism; and populist nativism that seeks to restore the historic power and prestige of indigenous elites.

==== France ====
Once Italian workers in France had understood the benefit of unionism, and French unions were willing to overcome their fear of Italians as strikebreakers, integration was open for most Italian immigrants. The French state, which was always more of an immigration state than other Western European nations, fostered and supported family-based immigration, and thus helped Italians on their immigration trajectory, with minimal nativism. Algerian migration to France has generated nativism, characterized by the prominence of Jean-Marie Le Pen and his National Front.

Since the 1990s France experienced rising levels of Islamic antisemitism and acts. By 2006, rising levels of antisemitism were recorded in French schools. Reports related to the tensions between the children of North African Muslim immigrants and North African Jewish children. In the first half of 2009, an estimated 631 recorded acts of antisemitism took place in France, more than the whole of 2008. Speaking to the World Jewish Congress in December 2009, the French Interior Minister Hortefeux described the acts of antisemitism as "a poison to our republic". He also announced that he would appoint a special coordinator for fighting racism and antisemitism.

==== Germany ====
For the Poles in the mining districts of western Germany before 1914, nationalism (on both the German and the Polish sides) kept Polish workers, who had established an associational structure approaching institutional completeness (churches, voluntary associations, press, even unions), separate from the host German society. Lucassen found that religiosity and nationalism were more fundamental in generating nativism and inter-group hostility than the labor antagonism.

Nativism grew rapidly in the 1990s and since.

==== United Kingdom ====
The city of London became notorious for the prevalence of nativist viewpoints in the 16th century, and conditions worsened in the 1580s. Many European immigrants became disillusioned by routine threats of assault, numerous attempts at passing legislation calling for the expulsion of foreigners, and the great difficulty in acquiring English citizenship. Cities in the Dutch Republic often proved more hospitable, and many immigrants left London permanently. Nativism emerged in opposition to Irish and Jewish arrivals in the early 20th century. Irish immigrants in Great Britain during the 20th century became estranged from British society, something which Lucassen (2005) attributes to the deep religious divide between Irish Protestants and Catholics.

== See also ==
- Criticism of multiculturalism
- Ethnocentrism
- History of immigration to the United States
- Identity politics
- Nationalism
- Opposition to immigration
- Racism
- Religious discrimination
- Supremacism
- White supremacy
- National socialism
- Xenophobia
- Antisemitism

== Bibliography ==
- Betz, Hans-Georg. " Facets of nativism: a heuristic exploration" Patterns of Prejudice (2019) 53#2 pp 111–135.
- Groenfeldt, D. "The future of indigenous values: cultural relativism in the face of economic development", Futures, 35#9 (2003), pp. 917–29
- Jensen, Richard. "Comparative Nativism: The United States, Canada and Australia, 1880s–1910s," Canadian Journal for Social Research (2010) vol 3#1 pp. 45–55
- McNally, Mark. Proving the way: conflict and practice in the history of Japanese nativism (2005)
- Mamdani, M. When Victims Become Killers: Colonialism, Nativism and the Genocide in Rwanda (2001)
- Minkenberg, Michael. "The Radical Right and Anti-Immigrant Politics in Liberal Democracies since World War II: Evolution of a Political and Research Field." Polity 53.3 (2021): 394–417. doi.org/10.1086/714167
- Mudde, Cas. The relationship between immigration and nativism in Europe and North America (Washington press, 2012) online.
- Yakushko, Oksana. Modern-Day Xenophobia: Critical Historical and Theoretical Perspectives on the Roots of Anti-Immigrant Prejudice (Palgrave Macmillan, 2018)
- Zeh, Frederick. "An Immigrant Soldier in the Mexican War." Texas A&M University Press, College Station. 1995.

=== United States ===
- Alexseev, Mikhail A. Immigration Phobia and the Security Dilemma: Russia, Europe, and the United States (Cambridge University Press, 2005). 294 pp.
- Allerfeldt, Kristofer. Race, Radicalism, Religion, and Restriction: Immigration in the Pacific Northwest, 1890–1924. Praeger, 2003. 235 pp.
- Anbinder, Tyler. "Nativism and prejudice against immigrants," in A companion to American immigration, ed. by Reed Ueda (2006) pp. 177–201 excerpt
- Barkan, Elliott R. "Return of the Nativists? California Public Opinion and Immigration in the 1980s and 1990s." Social Science History 2003 27(2): 229–83. ISSN 0145-5532 in Project MUSE
- Billington, Ray Allen. The Protestant Crusade, 1800–1860: A Study of the Origins of American Nativism (1964) online
- Franchot, Jenny. Roads to Rome: The Antebellum Protestant Encounter with Catholicism (1994)
- Finzsch, Norbert, and Dietmar Schirmer, eds. Identity and Intolerance: Nationalism, Racism, and Xenophobia in Germany and the United States (2002)
- Higham, John, Strangers in the Land: Patterns of American Nativism, 1860–1925 (1955), the standard scholarly history
- Hueston, Robert Francis. The Catholic Press and Nativism, 1840–1860 (1976)
- Hughey, Matthew W. 'Show Me Your Papers! Obama's Birth and the Whiteness of Belonging.' Qualitative Sociology 35(2): 163–81 (2012)
- Kaufmann, Eric. American Exceptionalism Reconsidered: Anglo-Saxon Ethnogenesis in the 'Universal' Nation, 1776–1850, Journal of American Studies, 33 (1999), 3, pp. 437–57.
- Lee, Erika. "America first, immigrants last: American xenophobia then and now." Journal of the Gilded Age and Progressive Era 19.1 (2020): 3–18. online
- Lee, Erika. America for Americans: A History of Xenophobia in the United States (2019). excerpt
- Leonard, Ira M. and Robert D. Parmet. American Nativism 1830–1860 (1971)
- Luebke, Frederick C. Bonds of Loyalty: German-Americans and World War I (1974)
- Oxx, Katie. The Nativist Movement in America: Religious Conflict in the 19th Century (2013)
- Schrag Peter. Not Fit For Our Society: Immigration and Nativism in America (University of California Press; 2010) 256 pp. online

=== Canada ===
- Houston, Cecil J. and Smyth, William J. The Sash Canada Wore: A Historical Geography of the Orange Order in Canada. U. of Toronto Press, 1980.
- McLaughlin, Robert. "Irish Nationalism and Orange Unionism in Canada: A Reappraisal," Éire-Ireland 41.3&4 (2007) 80–109
- Mclean, Lorna. "'To Become Part of Us': Ethnicity, Race, Literacy and the Canadian Immigration Act of 1919". Canadian Ethnic Studies 2004 36(2): 1–28. ISSN 0008-3496
- Miller, J. R. Equal Rights: The Jesuits’ Estates Act Controversy (1979). in late 19c Canada
- Palmer, Howard. Patterns of Prejudice: A History of Nativism in Alberta (1992)
- Robin, Martion. Shades of Right: Nativist and Fascist Politics in Canada, 1920–1940 (University of Toronto Press, 1992);
- See, S.W. Riots in New Brunswick: Orange Nativism and Social Violence in the 1840s (Univ of Toronto Press, 1993).
- Ward, W. Peter. White Canada Forever: Popular Attitudes and Public Policy toward Orientals in British Columbia (1978)

=== Europe ===
- Alexseev, Mikhail A. Immigration Phobia and the Security Dilemma: Russia, Europe, and the United States (Cambridge University Press, 2005). 294 pp.
- Art, David. Inside the Radical Right: The Development of Anti-Immigrant Parties in Western Europe (Cambridge University Press; 2011) 288 pp. – examines anti-immigration activists and political candidates in 11 countries.
- Betz, Hans-Georg. "Against the 'Green Totalitarianism': Anti-Islamic Nativism in Contemporary Radical Right-Wing Populism in Western Europe," in Christina Schori Liang, ed. Europe for the Europeans (2007)
- Betz, Hans-Georg. "Facets of nativism: a heuristic exploration" Patterns of Prejudice (2019) 53#2 pp 111–135.
- Betz, Hans-Georg. Radical Right-Wing Populism in Western Europe (1994).
- Ceuppens, Bambi. "Allochthons, Colonizers, and Scroungers: Exclusionary Populism in Belgium," African Studies Review, Volume 49, Number 2, September 2006, pp. 147–86 doi:10.1353/arw.2006.0102 "Allochthons" means giving welfare benefits only to those groups that are considered to "truly belong"
- Chapin, Wesley D. Germany for the Germans?: The Political Effects of International Migration (Greenwood, 1997).
- Chinn, Jeff, and Robert Kaiser, eds. Russians as the New Minority: Ethnicity and Nationalism in the Soviet Successor States (1996)
- Finzsch, Norbert, and Dietmar Schirmer, eds. Identity and Intolerance: Nationalism, Racism, and Xenophobia in Germany and the United States (2002)
- Lucassen, Leo. The Immigrant Threat: The Integration of Old and New Migrants in Western Europe since 1850. University of Illinois Press, 2005. 280 pp; ISBN 0-252-07294-4. Examines Irish immigrants in Britain, Polish immigrants in Germany, Italian immigrants in France (before 1940), and (since 1950), Caribbeans in Britain, Turks in Germany, and Algerians in France
- Liang, Christina Schori, ed. Europe for the Europeans (2007)
- Rose, Richard. "The End of Consensus in Austria and Switzerland," Journal of Democracy, Volume 11, Number 2, April 2000, pp. 26–40
- Wertheimer, Jack. Unwelcome Strangers: East European Jews in Imperial Germany (1991)
