= Anglo-Saxonism =

Racial belief system

Anglo-Saxonism is a cultural and racialist belief system developed by British and American intellectuals, politicians, and academics in the 19th century. Racialized Anglo-Saxonism contained both competing and intersecting doctrines, such as Victorian era-Old Northernism and the Teutonic germ theory which it relied upon in appropriating Germanic (particularly Norse) cultural and racial origins of the Anglo-Saxons.

Anglo-Saxonism originated in the 16th and 17th centuries as a non‑racial tradition, with some proto-racial elements, that broke from the Matter of Rome and Matter of Britain dominant medieval legends tracing England's origins to Troy and King Arthur and instead built a separate English identity on Anglo-Saxon heritage, culture, language, laws, and the Anglican Church of England independence from the Roman papacy. By the 19th century, this tradition had developed into a racial doctrine legitimizing an empire based on Anglo-Saxon roots, and in particular in America was used to justify colonization, racism, and manifest destiny.

Anglo-Saxonism was predominantly a product of Anglo-American societies and organisations of the era. These organisations promoted the idea that "the civilization of English-speaking nations was superior to that of any other nations because of racial traits and characteristics inherited from the Anglo-Saxon invaders of Britain".

Anglo-Saxonism is regarded as a predecessor ideology to the later Nordicism of the 20th century, which was generally less anti-Celtic and broadly sought to racially reconcile Celtic identity with Germanic under the label of Nordic.

== Background ==
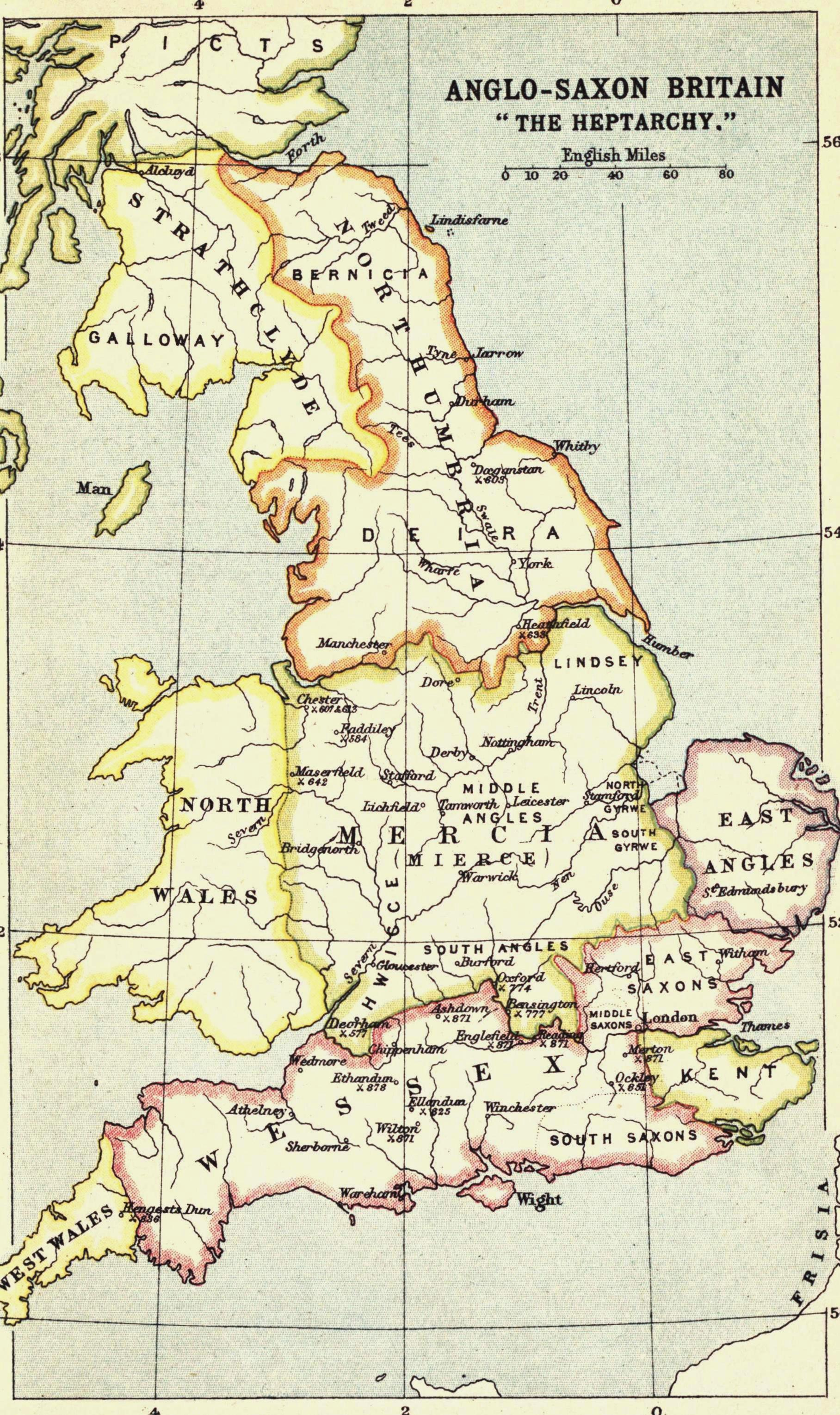
The Kingdoms of the Anglo-Saxon Heptarchy

In terminology, Anglo-Saxonism describes the historical ideology of rooting a Germanic racial identity, whether Anglo-Saxon, Norse, or Teutonic, into the concept of the English, Scottish or British nation, and subsequently founded-nations such as the United States, Canada, Australia, and New Zealand.

In both historical and contemporary literature however, Anglo-Saxonism has many derivations, such as the commonly used phrase Teutonism or Anglo-Teutonism, which can be used as form of catch-all to describe American or British Teutonism and further extractions such as English or Scottish Teutonism. It is also occasionally encompassed by the longer phrase Anglo-Saxon Teutonism, or shorter labels Anglism or Saxonism, along with the most frequently used term of Anglo-Saxonism itself.

American medievalist Allen Frantzen credits historian L. Perry Curtis's use of Anglo-Saxonism as a term for "an unquestioned belief in Anglo-Saxon 'genius'" during this period of history. Curtis has pointed toward a radical change from adulation of Anglo-Saxon institutions in the 16th and 17th centuries towards something more racial and imperialist. Barbara Yorke, a historian of Anglo-Saxon England, has similarly argued that the earlier self-governance oriented Anglo-Saxonism of Thomas Jefferson's era had by the mid-19th century developed into "a belief in racial superiority".

According to Australian scholar Helen Young, the ideology of Anglo-Saxonism was "profoundly racist" and influenced authors such as J. R. R. Tolkien and his fictional works into the 20th century. Similarly, Marxist writer Peter Fryer claimed that "Anglo-Saxonism was a form of racism that originally arose to justify the British conquest and occupation of Ireland". Some scholars believe the Anglo-Saxonism championed by historians and politicians of the Victorian era influenced and helped to spawn the Greater Britain Movement of the mid-20th-century. In 2019, the International Society of Anglo-Saxonists decided to change its name due to the potential confusion of their organization's name with racist Anglo-Saxonism.

At the passing of the Anglo-Saxonism era, progressive intellectual Randolph Bourne's essay Trans-National America reacted positively to integration ("We have needed the new peoples"), and while mocking the "indistinguishable dough of Anglo-Saxonism" in the context of very early 20th-century migration to the United States, Bourne manages to express an anxiety at the American melting pot theory.

== Origins ==
=== Early references ===
In 1647, English MP John Hare, who served during the Long Parliament, issued a pamphlet declaring England as a "member of the Teutonick nation, and descended out of Germany". In the context of the English Civil War, this anti-Norman and pro-Germanic paradigm has been identified as perhaps the earliest iteration of "English Teutonism" by Professor Nick Groom, who has suggested the 1714 Hanoverian succession, where the German House of Hanover ascended the throne of Great Britain, is the culmination of this Anglo-Saxonist ideology.

=== Teutonic germ theory ===
Many historians and political scientists in Britain and the United States were proponents of so-called "Teutonic germ theory" in the 19th century. The theory supposed that American and British democracy and institutions had their roots in Teutonic peoples, and that Germanic tribes had spread this "germ" within their race from ancient Germany to England and on to North America. Advocacy in Britain included the likes of John Mitchell Kemble, William Stubbs, and Edward Augustus Freeman. Within the U.S., future president Woodrow Wilson, along with Albert Bushnell Hart and Herbert Baxter Adams were applying historical and social science in advocacy for Anglo-Saxonism through the theory. In the 1890s, under the influence of Frederick Jackson Turner, Wilson abandoned the Teutonic germ theory in favor of a frontier model for the sources of American democracy.

== Ancestry and racial identity ==
=== Germanic and Teutonic ===
Anglo-Saxonism of the era sought to emphasize Britain's cultural and racial ties with Germany, frequently referring to Teutonic peoples as a source of strength and similarity. Contemporary historian Robert Boyce notes that many British politicians of the 19th century promoted these Germanic links, such as Henry Bulwer, 1st Baron Dalling and Bulwer who said that it was "in the free forests of Germany that the infant genius of our liberty was nursed", and Thomas Arnold who claimed that "Our English race is the German race; for though our Norman fathers had learned to speak a stranger's language, yet in blood, as we know, they were the Saxon's brethren both alike belonging to the Teutonic or German stock".

=== Norman and Celtic ===
Anglo-Saxonists in the 19th century often sought to downplay, or outright denigrate, the significance of both Norman and Celtic racial and cultural influence in Britain. However, some form of solidarity was expressed by some Anglo-Saxonists, who conveyed that Anglo-Saxonism was simply "the best-known term to denote that mix of Celtic, Saxon, Norse, and Norman blood which now flows in the united stream in the veins of the Anglo-Saxon peoples". Although a staunch Anglo-Saxonist, Thomas Carlyle had even disparagingly described the United States as a kind of "formless" Saxon tribal order, and claimed that Normans had given Anglo-Saxons and their descendants a greater sense of order for national structure, and that this was particularly evident in England.

=== Northern European ===
Edward Augustus Freeman, a leading Anglo-Saxonist of the 19th century, promoted a larger Northern European identity, favorably comparing civilizational roots from "German forest" or "Scandinavian rock" with the cultural legacy of ancient Greece and Rome. American scholar Mary Dockray-Miller expands on this concept to suggest that pre-World War I Anglo-Saxonism ideology helped establish the "primacy of northern European ancestry in United States culture at large".

=== Lowland Scottish ===
During the 19th century in particular, Scottish people living in Lowland Scotland, near the Anglo-Scottish border, "increasingly identified themselves with the Teutonic world destiny of Anglo-Saxonism", and sought to separate their identity from that of Highland Scots, or the "inhabitants of Romantic Scotland". With some considering themselves "Anglo-Saxon Lowlanders", public opinion of Lowland Scots turned on Gaels within the context of the Highland Famine, with suggestions of deportations to British colonies for Highlanders of the "'inferior Celtic race". Amongst others, Goldwin Smith, a devout Anglo-Saxonist, believed the Anglo-Saxon "race" included Lowland Scots and should not be exclusively defined by English ancestry within the context of the United Kingdom's greater empire.

Thomas Carlyle, himself a Scot, was one of the earliest notable people to express a "belief in Anglo-Saxon racial superiority". Historian Richard J. Finlay has suggested that the Scots National League, which campaigned for Scotland to separate from the United Kingdom, was a response or opposition to the history of "Anglo-Saxon teutonism" embedded in some Scottish culture.

== Mythology and religions ==
Anglo-Saxonism was largely aligned with Protestantism, generally perceiving Catholics as outsiders, and was orientated as an ideology in opposition to other "races", such as the Celts of Ireland and Latins of Spain.

Charles Kingsley, Regius Professor of Modern History at the University of Cambridge, was particularly focused on there being a "strong Norse element in Teutonism and Anglo-Saxonism". He blended Protestantism of the day with the Old Norse religion, saying that the Church of England was "wonderfully and mysteriously fitted for the souls of a free Norse-Saxon race". He believed the ancestors of Anglo-Saxons, Norse people and Germanic peoples had physically fought beside the god Odin, and that the British monarchy of his time was genetically descended from him.

== Political aims ==
"An Heir to the Throne, or the Next Republican Candidate" (1860), a racist lithograph by the New York firm Currier & Ives. The cartoon attacks Abraham Lincoln and the Republican Party by satirically depicting their support for Black rights, putting in Lincoln's mouth the claim that a Black man proves "the superiority of the Colored over the Anglo Saxon race"

=== Expansion ===
Embedded in 19th century, American Anglo-Saxonism was a growing sense that the "Anglo Saxon" race had to expand into surrounding territories. This particularly expressed itself in the ideology of manifest destiny, which claimed the U.S. had a right to expand across North America.

Theodore Roosevelt's foreign policy was influenced by Anglo-Saxonism. Before becaming president, he had stated that the “English-speaking races” shared a unique capacity for self-government, expansion, and civilization. As early as 1882, in his Naval War of 1812, Roosevelt wrote that "the Americans and the British are two substantially similar branches of the great English race, which both before and after their separation have assimilated, and made Englishmen of many other peoples". This belief in a transatlantic racial kinship shaped his approach to international crises. Roosevelt admired Edmond Demolins's Anglo-Saxon Superiority, a work arguing for the superiority of English-speaking peoples, having a copy of the work leading his rough riders during the invasion of Cuba in the Spanish–American War. Ideas of Anglo-Saxon racial kinship influenced Anglo-American perceptions of international politics between 1890 and 1910. During this period, American and British leaders increasingly excluded Germany from the conceptual category of "Anglo‑Saxon" or "Teutonic" kin. Instead, Germany came to be seen as a rival imperial power whose growing navy and colonial ambitions threatened the "English‑speaking race".

=== Shared citizenship ===
Legal theorist Albert Venn Dicey believed in the Anglo-Saxonist idea of a shared citizenship between Britons and Americans, and the concept of cooperation, even federation, of those from the "Anglo-Saxon" race.

=== Nazism ===
Nazi racial theories were influenced by earlier beliefs that Nordic ancestry is superior to all others, which was originally embraced as "Anglo-Saxonism" in England and the United States, "Teutonicism" in Germany, and "Frankisism" in Northern France. Hitler was envious of the United States and Britain for possessing vast territories and resources, which benefited the Anglo-Saxons. Germany, by contrast, had lost many of its best people to emigration, especially to the U.S., causing a demographic decline.

== See also ==
- Anglosphere
- British Israelism
- Englishry
- Ku Klux Klan
- White Anglo-Saxon Protestants (WASP)
