= Old Stock Americans =

Americans who are descended from the original settlers of the Thirteen Colonies

Old Stock American Colonial Stock, Pioneer Stock
Regions with significant populations
- United States and Canada

Languages
- Mainly American English, with minorities speaking Pennsylvania German, Jersey Dutch, Swedish, French, and Scottish Gaelic

Religion
- Almost entirely Christianity (primarily Protestantism)

Related ethnic groups
- British, English, Irish, Welsh, Scots, Old Stock Canadians, French Canadians, Huguenots, Anglo-Celtic Australians, European New Zealanders, Anglo-Indians, British diaspora in Africa, Scotch-Irish, New Netherlanders, American Hessians, New England Planters

Old Stock American (also known as Colonial Stock, Founding Stock, Heritage Americans, or Pioneer Stock) is a colloquial name for Americans who are descended from the original settlers of the Thirteen Colonies. Historically, Old Stock Americans have been mainly Protestants from the British Isles (English, Scottish, Scots-Irish, and Welsh), whose ancestors emigrated to British America in the 17th and 18th centuries.

== 17th to late-18th century ==
The primary settlers of the 17th century were more homogenously English and established the foundations of the country and basis of its culture, whereas the later settlers of the 18th century were more varied in ancestry: 90% of them were Scots, Scots-Irish, Irish, Germans and Huguenots. This period was more characterized with expanding the established settlements.

The U.S. Census Bureau estimates the population of the Thirteen Colonies in July 1776 was 2.56 million, and around 3.9 million in 1790 - of which around 3.2 million were of European American stock. About 85% of the White population in 1790 was British: English and Welsh (64%), Scottish, directly from Scotland or via Ulster, (15.8%) and Irish (5.8%). In addition there were Germans (8.9%) Dutch (3.1%), French (2.1%) and others including Jewish immigrants (less than 0.1%).

=== British settlers in New England ===
The first proposed coat of arms of the United States created by Pierre Eugene du Simitiere. It featured the emblems of England (and Wales), Scotland, Ireland, France, Germany, and the Netherlands, symbolizing the ancestral origins of the American colonists.

While the majority of colonists were from Great Britain, these were not monolithic in ethnic, political, social, and cultural origins, but rather transplanted different Old World folkways to the New World. The two most significant colonies had been settled by opposing factions in the English Civil War and the wider Wars of the Three Kingdoms. The founders of Plymouth and Massachusetts Bay Colony in the North were mostly Puritans from East Anglia, who had been influenced by egalitarian Roundhead republican ideals of Oliver Cromwell's Commonwealth of England and the Protectorate; in New England they concentrated in towns where decisions were made by direct democracy, prizing communal conformity, social equality, and Puritan work ethic. Partially owing to the insularity of Puritan communities, colonial New England was far more homogeneously "English" than other regions, in contrast to the historically tolerant Dutch colonial parts of the Northeast, and more diverse colonies of the Mid-Atlantic and the South which from an early stage had strong elements of German and Scottish stock, from varying religious traditions.

=== British settlers in the Old South ===
Conversely, in Chesapeake Colonies to the south, the Colony of Virginia had been settled by their Cavalier royalist rivals—many younger sons of English gentry who fled Southern England when Cromwell took power, accompanied by indentured servants. Sir William Berkeley, colonial governor of Virginia, loyal to King Charles I, banished Puritans while offering refuge to the Virginia Cavaliers—many of whom became First Families of Virginia. For his colony's fidelity to the Crown, Charles II awarded Virginia its nickname "Old Dominion". In contrast to egalitarian and collectivist New England Colonies to the north, settlers of the Southern Colonies in Virginia, Maryland, Carolina, and Georgia recreated a hierarchical social order governed by an aristocratic American gentry which would dominate the antebellum Old South for generations. Sons of British nobility established American plantations where the planter class employed indentured servants to farm cash crops; later replaced by African slaves, especially in Deep South states where a feudal West Indies-style slave plantation economy developed. Freed English American indentured servants, along with Scottish Americans, Scotch-Irish Americans, Palatines and other German Americans pioneered hilly wilderness areas not yet settled by Europeans, becoming old stock of the mountainous backcountry. To contrast against Yankee "Anglo-Saxon" democratic radicalism of New England, at times even English Americans in Dixie (especially in decades leading up to the American Civil War) would not only identify with chivalrous Cavaliers, but even assert a distinct aristocratic racial heritage as knightly heirs to the Normans who conquered and civilized "barbaric" and unruly Anglo-Saxons of medieval England.

== 19th to mid-20th century ==
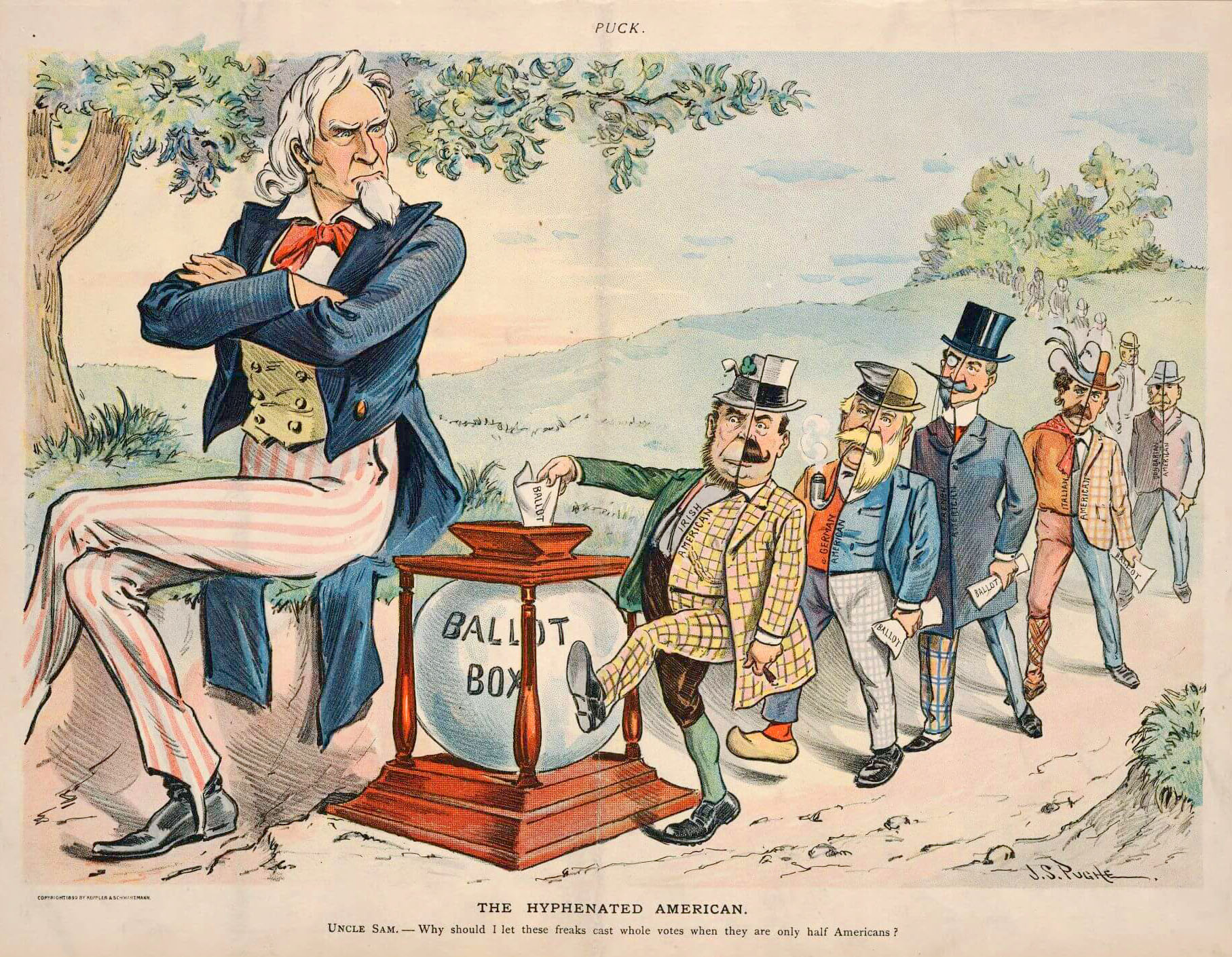
Cartoon from Puck, August 9, 1899 by J. S. Pughe. Uncle Sam sees hyphenated voters and asks, "Why should I let these freaks cast whole ballots when they are only half Americans?" The first five men are labeled Irish-American, German-American, French-American, Italian-American, and Hungarian-American.

Until the second half of the 20th century, the Old Stock dominated American culture and Republican party politics. Of the 15 leading American cities, 7 elected a Catholic as mayor before the Civil War, and 13 had done so by 1893. The last two were Edward Dempsey in Cincinnati in 1906, and James Tate in Philadelphia in 1962.

Beginning in the 1840s, millions of German and Irish Catholics immigrated to fill new jobs in the rapidly industrializing United States. The Know Nothing movement emerged with an anti-Catholic platform in the North. It had brief success in the mid 1850s, but subsequently collapsed. Its presidential candidate, former president Millard Fillmore, took 22% of the total national vote in the 1856 United States presidential election, but he was not a party member and he disavowed its anti-Catholic tone.

== Sub-groups ==
=== English-Americans ===
The largest and most principal ethnic group within the Old Stock are the English-Americans, whose ancestors emigrated via England directly, or via partially English-descended populations, such as the Anglo-Irish and Scots-Irish. English Americans as the dominant ethno-cultural group comprised most of the primary 17th century settlers rather than immigrants from the 18th century. Most of these early settlers came from what is referred to as Southern England.

English settlement in what is today America began with Jamestown in the Virginia Colony in 1607. With the permission of James I, three ships (the Susan Constant, The Discovery, and The God Speed) sailed from England and landed at Cape Henry in April, under the captainship of Christopher Newport, who had been hired by the London Company to lead expeditions to what is now America.

The second successful colony was Plymouth Colony, founded in 1620 by people who later became known as the Pilgrims. Fleeing religious persecution in the East Midlands in England, they first went to Holland, but feared losing their English identity. Because of this, they chose to relocate to the New World, with their voyage being financed by English investors. In September 1620, 102 passengers set sail aboard the Mayflower, eventually settling at Plymouth Colony in November.

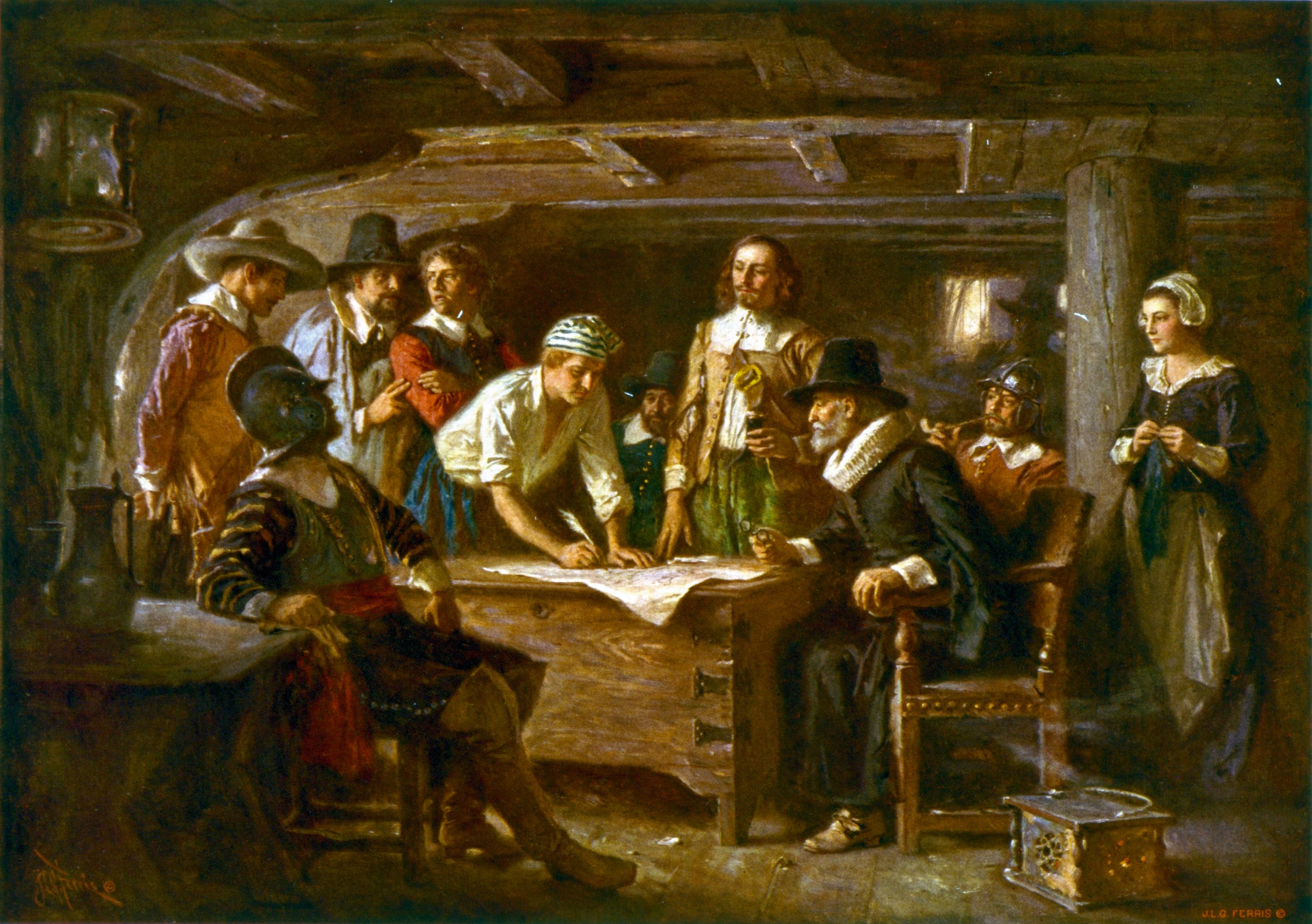
The first self-governing document of Plymouth Colony. English Pilgrims signing the Mayflower Compact in 1620.

Of the passengers on the Mayflower, 41 men signed the "Mayflower Compact" aboard ship on November 11, 1620, while anchored in Provincetown Harbor. Signers included Carver, Alden, Standish, Howland, Bradford, Allerton, and Fuller. This story has become a central theme in the United States cultural identity.

A number of English colonies were established under a system of proprietary governors, who were appointed under mercantile charters to English joint stock companies to found and run settlements.

England also took control over the Dutch colony of New Netherland (including the New Amsterdam settlement), renaming it the Province of New York in 1664. With New Netherland, the English came to control the former New Sweden (in what is now Delaware), which the Dutch had conquered from Sweden earlier. This became part of Pennsylvania.

=== Scottish-Americans ===
The second largest group were the Scottish-Americans, whose ancestors emigrated via Scotland directly, or via the predominately Scottish-descended Ulster Scots, or Scots-Irish, in Ulster. Most Scotch-Irish Americans descended from the largely Scots-speaking Lowlands although a sizeable percentage of them were actually of Northern English in origin.

After the Union of the Crowns of Scotland and England in 1603, King James VI, a Scotsman, promoted joint expeditions overseas, and became the founder of British America. The first permanent English settlement in the Americas, Jamestown, was thus named for a Scot.

In the 1670s and 1680s Presbyterian Dissenters fled persecution by the Royalist privy council in Edinburgh to settle in South Carolina and New Jersey, where they maintained their distinctive religious culture.

More than 50,000 Scots, principally from the west coast, settled in the Thirteen Colonies between 1763 and 1776, the majority of these in their own communities in the South, especially North Carolina, although Scottish individuals and families also began to appear as professionals and artisans in every American town. Scots arriving in Florida and the Gulf Coast traded extensively with Native Americans.

Large groups of Highland Scots started arriving in North America in the 1730s. Unlike their Lowland and Ulster counterparts, the Highlanders tended to cluster together in self-contained communities, where they maintained their distinctive cultural features such as the Gaelic language and piobaireachd music. Groups of Highlanders existed in coastal Georgia (mainly immigrants from Inverness-shire) and the Mohawk Valley in New York (from the West Highlands). By far the largest Highland community was centered on the Cape Fear River, which saw a stream of immigrants from Argyllshire, and, later, other regions such as the Isle of Skye. Highland Scots were overwhelmingly Loyalists in the Revolution. Distinctly Highland cultural traits persisted in the region until the 19th century, at which point they were assimilated into Anglo-American culture.

The Ulster Scots, known as the Scots-Irish (or Scotch-Irish) in North America, were predominately descended from people originating in the Lowlands of Scotland, as well as from the north of England and other regions, who colonized the province of Ulster in Ireland in the 17th century. After several generations, their descendants left for America, and struck out for the frontier, in particular the Appalachian mountains, providing an effective "buffer" for attacks from Native Americans. In the colonial era, they were usually simply referred to as "Irish," with the "Scots-" or "Scotch-" prefixes becoming popular when the descendants of the Ulster emigrants wanted to differentiate themselves from Irish Catholics who were flocking to many American cities in the 19th century. Unlike the Highlanders and Lowlanders, the Scots-Irish were usually Patriots in the Revolution. They have been noted for their tenacity and their cultural contributions to the United States.

There have been several historical figures with (Old Stock) Scottish ancestry, including US presidents (Thomas Jefferson, James Monroe, Andrew Jackson, James Buchanan, William McKinley, Woodrow Wilson, and more), as well as founding fathers (Alexander Hamilton, James Wilson, John Witherspoon, James McHenry, and several more).

=== Welsh-Americans ===
Welsh settlers were on the three ships that headed for what is now Jamestown in late December 1606. Additional Welsh settlers arrived in America, such as Hugh Gwyn and David ap Hugh - two tradesmen who arrived in Jamestown with the Second Supply in 1608. More Welsh arrivals came from Wales after 1618. In the mid to late seventeenth century, there was a large emigration of Welsh Quakers to the Colony of Pennsylvania, where a Welsh Tract was established in the region immediately west of Philadelphia. The first Governor of the Province of New Hampshire was John Cutt, a Welsh-born settler; he governed the colony until his death in 1681. By 1700, Welsh people accounted for about one-third of the colony's estimated population of twenty-thousand. There are a number of Welsh place names in this area (eg. North Wales, Newport, Gwynedd). The Welsh were especially numerous and politically active and elected 9% of the members of the Pennsylvania Provincial Council.

There have been several historical figures with (Old Stock) Welsh ancestry, including US presidents (Thomas Jefferson, John Adams, John Quincy Adams, James A. Garfield, Calvin Coolidge, Richard Nixon, and more), as well as founding fathers (William Floyd, Button Gwinnett, Francis Lewis, Gouverneur Morris, Lewis Morris, and several more).

=== Irish-Americans ===
Most settlers from Ireland were not of native Irish descent, but of English or Scottish descent. Half of the Irish immigrants to the United States in its colonial era (1607–1775) came from the Irish province of Ulster and were largely Protestant, while the other half came from the other three provinces (Leinster, Munster, and Connacht).

The very first Irish settlers - Francis Magnel (or Francisco Maguel) and Dionis Oconor - arrived in Jamestown with the First and Second supplies, respectively.

Most Irish immigrants to the Americas traveled as indentured servants, with their passage paid for by a wealthier person to whom they owed labor for a period of time. Some were merchants and landowners, who served as key players in a variety of different mercantile and colonizing enterprises.

In the 1620s significant numbers of Irish laborers began traveling to English colonies such as Virginia on the continent, and the Leeward Islands and Barbados in the Caribbean region.

In the 17th century, immigration from Ireland to the Thirteen Colonies was confined mostly to male Irish indentured servants who were primarily Catholic and peaked with 8,000 prisoner-of-war penal transports to the Chesapeake Colonies from the Cromwellian conquest of Ireland in the 1650s.

In the 18th century, emigration from Ireland to the Thirteen Colonies shifted from being primarily Catholic to being primarily Protestant. With the exception of the 1790s, it would remain so until the mid-to-late 1830s, with Presbyterians constituting the absolute majority until 1835. These Protestant immigrants were principally descended from Scottish and English settlers in Ulster.

From 1717 to 1775, though scholarly estimates vary, the most common approximation is that 250,000 immigrants from Ireland emigrated to the Thirteen Colonies. By the beginning of the American Revolutionary War in 1775, approximately only 2 to 3 percent of the colonial labor force was composed of indentured servants, and of those arriving from Britain from 1773 to 1776, fewer than 5 percent were from Ireland (while 85 percent remained male and 72 percent went to the Southern Colonies). Out of the 115 killed at the Battle of Bunker Hill, 22 were Irish-born. Their names include Callaghan, Casey, Collins, Connelly, Dillon, Donohue, Flynn, McGrath, Nugent, Shannon, and Sullivan.

In the 18th century Thirteen Colonies and the independent United States, while interethnic marriage among Catholics remained a dominant pattern, Catholic-Protestant intermarriage became more common (notably in the Shenandoah Valley where intermarriage among Ulster Protestants and the significant minority of Irish Catholics in particular was not uncommon or stigmatized). While fewer Catholic parents required that their children be disinherited in their wills if they renounced Catholicism, compared to the rest of the US population, this response was more common among Catholic parents that Protestants.

There have been several historical figures with (Old Stock) Irish ancestry, including US presidents (Andrew Johnson and Grover Cleveland), as well as founding fathers (Charles Carroll, Daniel Carroll, Thomas Lynch Jr, Thomas FitzSimmons, James Duane, and several more).

=== German-Americans ===
German-Americans were the largest group originating outside of the British Isles.

In 1608 five glassmakers and three carpenters or house builders arrived at Jamestown - the first permanent British settlement. The first permanent German settlement in what became the United States was Germantown, Pennsylvania, founded near Philadelphia on October 6, 1683.

Large numbers of Germans migrated from the 1680s to 1760s, with Pennsylvania the favored destination. They migrated to America for a variety of reasons. Push factors involved worsening opportunities for farm ownership in central Europe, persecution of some religious groups, and military conscription; pull factors were better economic conditions, especially the opportunity to own land, and religious freedom. Often immigrants paid for their passage by selling their labor for a period of years as indentured servants.

Large sections of Pennsylvania, Upstate New York, and the Shenandoah Valley of Virginia attracted Germans. Most were Lutheran or German Reformed; many belonged to small religious sects such as the Moravians and Mennonites.

In 1709, Protestant Germans from the Pfalz or Palatine region of Germany escaped conditions of poverty, traveling first to Rotterdam and then to London. Queen Anne helped them get to the American colonies. The trip was long and difficult to survive because of the poor quality of food and water aboard ships and the infectious disease typhus. Many immigrants, particularly children, died before reaching America in June 1710.

They kept to themselves, married their own, spoke German, attended Lutheran churches, and retained their own customs and foods. They emphasized farm ownership. Some mastered English to become conversant with local legal and business opportunities. They tolerated slavery (although few were rich enough to own a slave).

Shortly thereafter, the first colonization of Louisiana would be organized by John Law, with the help of German immigrants - primarily from the Alsace Region. The Mississippi Company settled thousands of German pioneers in French Louisiana during 1721.

Two waves of German colonists in 1714 and 1717 founded a colony in Virginia called Germanna, located near modern-day Culpeper, Virginia. The name "Germanna", selected by Governor Alexander Spotswood, reflected both the German immigrants who sailed across the Atlantic to Virginia and the British queen, Anne, who was in power at the time of the first settlement at Germanna.

The tide of German immigration to Pennsylvania swelled between 1725 and 1775, with immigrants arriving as redemptioners or indentured servants. By 1775, Germans constituted about one-third of the population of the state. German farmers were renowned for their highly productive animal husbandry and agricultural practices. Politically, they were generally inactive until 1740, when they joined a Quaker-led coalition that took control of the legislature, which later supported the American Revolution. Despite this, many of the German settlers were Loyalists during the Revolution, possibly because they feared their royal land grants would be taken away by a new republican government, or because of loyalty to a British German monarchy who had provided the opportunity to live in a liberal society. The Germans, comprising Lutherans, Reformed, Mennonites, Amish, and other sects, developed a rich religious life with a strong musical culture. Collectively, they came to be known as the Pennsylvania Dutch (from Deutsch).

In the American Revolution the Mennonites and other small religious sects were neutral pacifists. The Lutherans of Pennsylvania were on the patriot side. The Muhlenberg family, led by Rev. Henry Muhlenberg was especially influential on the Patriot side. His son Peter Muhlenberg, a Lutheran clergyman in Virginia became a major general and later a Congressman. However, in upstate New York, many Germans were neutral or supported the Loyalist cause.

There have been several historical figures with (Old Stock) German ancestry, including US presidents (Dwight D. Eisenhower and Herbert Hoover).

=== Dutch-Americans ===
The earliest Dutch settlement was built around 1613; it consisted of a number of small huts built by the crew of the Tijger (Tiger), a Dutch ship under the command of Captain Adriaen Block which had caught fire while sailing on the Hudson in the winter of 1613. The ship was lost and Block and his crew established a camp ashore. In the spring, Block and his men did some explorations along the coast of Long Island. Block Island still bears his name. Finally, they were sighted and rescued by another Dutch ship and the settlement was abandoned.

Permanent settlers arrived in 1617 at what is now Albany, New York. New Amsterdam was settled in 1625. In 1629, Dutch officials tried to expand the northern colony through a plan that promised "Liberties and Exemptions" to anyone who would ship fifty colonists to America at his own expense. Anyone who did so would be allowed to buy a stretch of land along the Hudson River from the Dutch West India Company of about twelve miles, extending as far inland as the owner wanted. The landowners were called patroons and had complete jurisdiction over their domains as well as extensive trading privileges. They also received these rights in perpetuity. That was a form of feudalism, which had vanished in the Dutch Republic but was introduced in North America. The Patroonships were not a success; by 1635, the Dutch West India Company had bought back four of the five patroonships originally registered in Amsterdam.

The Native Americans were no longer consulted, offered or asked to sell their lands. The Dutch were confronted with a new phenomenon, Native American raids, since the local tribes had now realized that the Dutch were not simply visitors but people set to settle their land.

The Dutch realized that they had gone with the wrong approach as they offered great privileges to wealthy, not poor, citizens. It was not until 1656 that the Dutch state abandoned its passivity and decided to actively support New Netherland. The Dutch state issued a proclamation, which stated that "all mechanics and farmers who can prove their ability to earn a living here shall receive free passage for themselves, their wives and children".

Although the Dutch were in control, only about half the settlers were ethnically Dutch (the other half consisted mainly of Walloons, Germans, and French Huguenots as well as New England Yankees). Manhattan grew increasingly multicultural. In 1664, the English seized the colony and renamed it New York. The Dutch briefly recaptured the colony in 1673, but during peace talks with the English, they decided to trade it in 1674 for Suriname in South America, which was more profitable.

In the hundred years of British rule that followed the change of ownership of New Netherland, Dutch immigration to America came to an almost complete standstill.

While the Netherlands was a small country, the Dutch Empire was quite large so emigrants leaving the mother country had a wide variety of choices. New Amsterdam was not high on their list, especially because of the Native American risk. The major Dutch cities were centers of high culture, but they still sent immigrants. Most new arrivals were farmers from remote villages who, on arrival, in America scattered into widely separated villages with little contact with one another. Even inside a settlement, different Dutch groups had minimal interaction. With very few new arrivals, the result was an increasingly traditional system cut off from the forces for change. The people maintained their popular culture, revolving around their language and their Calvinist religion.

Dutch Quakers came to the Philadelphia area in response to the appeal of William Penn. Penn, himself of mixed British and Dutch descent (his mother being from Rotterdam), had paid three visits to the Netherlands, where he published several pamphlets.

There have been several historical figures with (Old Stock) Dutch ancestry, including US presidents (Martin van Buren and Theodore Roosevelt), as well as founding fathers (John Jay, Robert R. Livingston, Nicholas van Dyke, and several more).

=== French-Americans ===
In the 17th and early 18th centuries, there was an influx of a few thousand Huguenots, who were Calvinist refugees fleeing religious persecution following the issuance of the 1685 Edict of Fontainebleau by Louis XIV of the Kingdom of France. Some of these refugees settled in the Dutch colony of New Netherland and its capital city, New Netherland, including being among the first Europeans to settle on Staten Island. In 1674, with the signing of the Treaty of Westminster to end the Third Anglo-Dutch War (1672-1674), the Netherlands ceded the colony to Great Britain, who renamed the colony New York, and its capital to New York City, after Prince James, Duke of York, the brother of King Charles II of England.

For nearly a century, French settlers fostered a distinctive French Protestant identity that enabled them to remain aloof from American society, but by the time of the American Revolution, they had generally intermarried and merged into the larger Presbyterian community. In 1700, they constituted 13% of the white population of the Province of Carolina, and 5% of the white population of the Province of New York. The largest number settling in South Carolina, where the French comprised around 2% of the White population in 1790. With the help of the well-organized international Huguenot community, many also moved to Virginia. In the north, Paul Revere of Boston was a prominent figure.

The Cajuns of Louisiana have a unique heritage. Their ancestors settled Acadia, in what is now the Canadian provinces of New Brunswick, Nova Scotia, Prince Edward Island and part of Maine in the 17th and early 18th centuries. In 1755, after capturing Fort Beauséjour and several other French forts in the region, British authorities demanded the Acadians swear an oath of loyalty to the British Crown, which the majority refused to do. In response, the British deported them to the Thirteen Colonies in the south in what has become known as the expulsion of the Acadians. Over the next generation, some four thousand Acadians made the long trek to Louisiana, where they began a new life. The name Cajun is a corruption of the word Acadian. Many still live in what is known as the Cajun Country, where much of their colonial culture survives. French Louisiana, when it was sold by Napoleon in 1803, covered all or part of fifteen current U.S. states and contained French and Canadian colonists dispersed across it, though they were most numerous in its southernmost portion.

A new influx of French-heritage people occurred at the very end of the colonial era. Following the failed invasion of Quebec in 1775-1776, hundreds of French-Canadian men who had enlisted in the Continental Army remained in the ranks. Under colonels James Livingston and Moses Hazen, they saw military action across the main theaters of the Revolutionary War. At the end of the war, New York State formed the Canadian and Nova Scotia Refugee Tract stretching westward from Lake Champlain. Though many of the veterans sold their claims in this vast region, some remained and the settlement held. From early colonizing efforts in the 1780s to the era of Quebec's "great hemorrhage," the French-Canadian presence in Clinton County in northeastern New York was inescapable.

=== Composition of the colonies ===
According to the United States Historical Census Data Base (USHCDB), the ethnic populations in the British American Colonies of 1700, 1755, and 1775 were:

Ethnic composition in the British American Colonies of 1700, 1755, 1775
1700	%	1755	%	1775	%
English and Welsh	80.0	English and Welsh	52.0	English	48.7
African	11.0	African	20.0	African	20.0
Dutch	4.0	German	7.0	Scots-Irish	7.8
Scottish	3.0	Scots-Irish	7.0	German	6.9
Other European	2.0	Irish	5.0	Scottish	6.6
		Scottish	4.0	Dutch	2.7
		Dutch	3.0	French	1.4
		Other European	2.0	Swedish	0.6
				Other	5.3
Colonies	100	Colonies	100	Thirteen Colonies	100

== Modern day ==
After the end of World War I, many German immigrants (especially Lutherans) began to consider themselves "Old Stock" in reaction to xenophobia against immigrants from Eastern and Southeastern Europe.

== See also ==
- Old Stock Canadians
- Old Stock Australians
- Albion's Seed
- American ancestry
- Anglo-Americans
- Anglo-Saxonism in the 19th century
- British Americans
- Daughters of the American Revolution
- Demographic history of the United States
- Florida cracker
- French Louisianians
- Heritage American
- Historical racial and ethnic demographics of the United States
- Immigration to the United States
- Jamestown Polish craftsmen
- Jim Crow laws
- Manx Americans
- Maps of American ancestries
- Mayflower Society
- Mountain white
- Nativism in United States politics
- Neo-Confederates
- Nordicism
- One-drop rule
- Sons of the American Revolution
- Weaver family (North Carolina)
- White Anglo-Saxon Protestants (WASPs)
- White Southerners
- Spanish-Portuguese Jews in the United States
