= Richard J. Finlay =

Professor Richard J. Finlay FRHistS is the current Head of the School of Humanities at the University of Strathclyde and the author of a number of books, particularly on the modern history of Scotland.

He has previously articulated the view that history has an important place in a modern democracy.

== Publications ==
Some of his main publications include:

- Finlay, Richard (1994). Independent and Free: Scottish Politics and the Origins of the SNP. Edinburgh: John Donald Publishers. ISBN 0-85976-399-4.
- Finlay, Richard (1997). A Partnership for Good?. Edinburgh: John Donald. ISBN 0-85976-411-7.
- Finlay, Richard (2003). Modern Scotland : 1914-2000. London: Profile. ISBN 1-86197-299-7.

He has also edited such books as:

- Broun, Dauvit; Richard J Finlay; Michael Lynch (1998). Image and Identity: The Making and Remaking of Scottish National Identity Through the Ages. Edinburgh: John Donald Publishers. ISBN 0-85976-409-5.
- Devine, T.; Richard J Finlay (1996). Scotland in the Twentieth Century. Edinburgh: Edinburgh University Press. ISBN 0-7486-0751-X.
- Cowan, Edward (2000). Scotland since 1688: The Struggle for a Nation. City: Cima Books. ISBN 1-903116-15-5.
- Edward J Cowan; Richard J Finlay (2003). Scottish History: The Power of the Past. Edinburgh: Edinburgh University Press. ISBN 0-7486-1419-2.
