= Heritage American =

Right-wing political trope

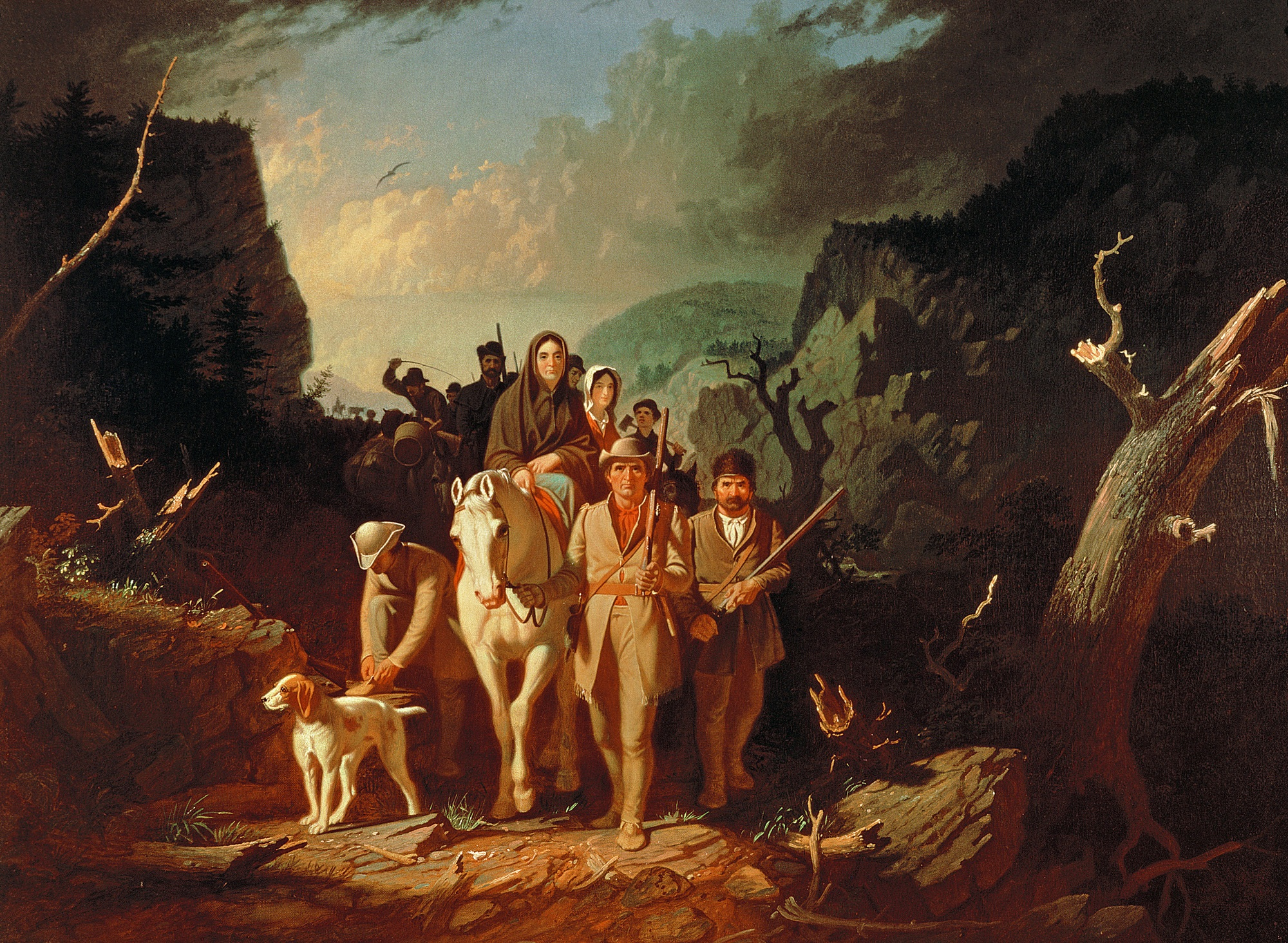
Imagery of the American frontier is associated with the trope.

Heritage American is a designation that became popular in American national conservatism and the MAGA movement in 2025. Definitions vary, but it generally encompasses "present-day Americans who trace their ancestral roots to the colonial period, or shortly thereafter".

It is mainly used to identify people descending from Anglo-Protestant and Scotch-Irish white settlers who lived in the original colonies and later moved west to settle the American frontier. Some definitions include Native Americans and descendants of enslaved people. Proponents of the heritage American identity have opposed what they call "propositional nationalism" (referring to civic nationalism) as having emerged as a result of immigration changes brought about by the Hart-Celler Act of 1965 that abolished the US immigration system's usage of national origin quotas. Proponents of heritage American identity claim that the Hart-Celler Act lead to a fundamental alteration of American citizenship to a propositional nationalism which they would like to reverse.

The term has been criticized as a euphemism for white Americans with New York Times writer Ezekiel Kkweku claiming that the term has been used "to launder white nationalism with facially neutral language". C. Jay Engel contests the association of it with white Americans in general because he claims it cannot be reduced down to racial or ethnic categories noting that today a second generation Swedish American would be a white American but would not be a heritage American.

== History ==
In July 2025 United States Vice President JD Vance said "we're a particular place with a particular people [...] Our ancestors realized that to carve a successful nation from new land meant creating new tangible things, new homes, new towns, new infrastructure to tame a wild continent. That is our heritage as Americans."

== Heritage vs creed ==
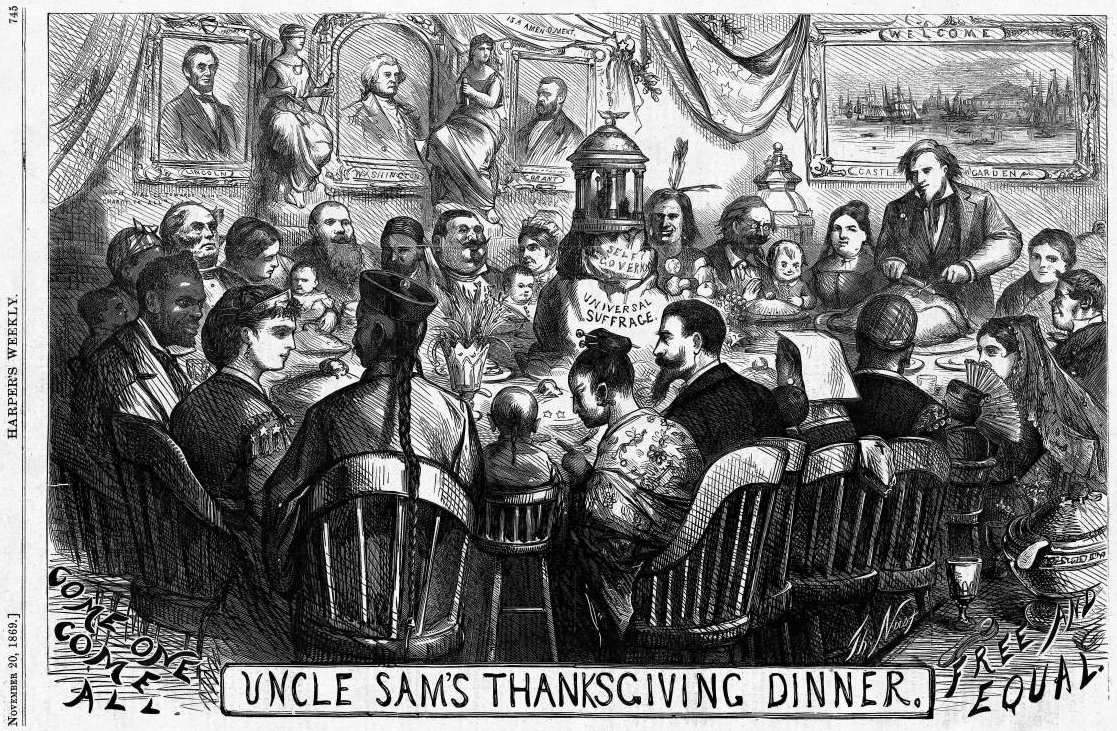
An 1869 Thomas Nast cartoon espousing a creedal civic nationalist conception of Americans being of different ancestries and ethnic backgrounds sitting together at a dinner table with Columbia to enjoy a Thanksgiving meal as equal members of the American citizenry while Uncle Sam carves the turkey, where membership in the nation is not dependent upon ethnicity.

The idea of a Heritage America is distinct from the notion of a creedal America, which is the view that America is defined by a set of values rather than shared ancestry.

== See also ==
- American ancestry
- American nationalism
- Historical racial and ethnic demographics of the United States
- Immigration policy of the second Trump administration
- Nativism in United States politics
- Old Stock American
- Political positions of JD Vance
- White Anglo-Saxon Protestants
- White nationalism in the United States
