= Mary Dockray-Miller =

American scholar of Anglo-Saxon England

Mary Dockray-Miller (born 1965) is an American scholar of early medieval England and women’s educational history, best known for her work on gender in the pre-Conquest period. She has published on female saints, on Beowulf, and on religious women. She was professor of English at Lesley University, where she taught from 2000-2024 before being laid off as part of a restructuring process that eliminated 30 faculty jobs, most in the traditional liberal arts and sciences.

Dockray-Miller's first monograph was Motherhood and Mothering in Anglo-Saxon England (St. Martin's Press, 2000), which utilized postmodern gender theory (the work of Judith Butler, Luce Irigaray, and others) to reinvestigate historical elements, such as double houses and early English religious women, and literature, including Beowulf. At the time, it was "the first and only monograph on motherhood to appear in Anglo-Saxon studies". She edited the Wilton Chronicle in Saints Edith and Æthelthryth: Princesses, Miracle Workers, and their Late Medieval Audience (Brepols, 2009) and published a biography of Judith of Flanders (c.1031-1094) in 2015. She has published numerous articles in medieval studies, English studies, and gender studies journals; she is a contributor to the Historical Dictionary of Women's Education in the United States (Greenwood, 1998), the Dictionary of National Biography, and other reference works.

== Publications ==
- “Margaret Atwood’s Medieval Testaments” Margaret Atwood Studies 17 (2024): 8-24.
- "Afrisc Meowle: Exploring the Other in the Old English Exodus" PMLA 137.3 (2022): 458-471.
- Public Medievalists, Racism, and Suffrage in the American Women's College Palgrave, 2017.
- “Old English Has A Serious Image Problem” JSTOR Daily, 3 May 2017.
- The Books and the Life of Judith of Flanders. Ashgate Publishing, 2015.
- Saints Edith and Æthelthryth: Princesses, Miracle Workers, and their Late Medieval Audience. Medieval Women: Texts and Contexts vol.25. Brepols, 2009.
- Motherhood and Mothering in Anglo-Saxon England St. Martin’s Press, 2000.
- "Beowulf's Tears of Fatherhood," Exemplaria 10.1 (1998): 1-28.
- "The Feminized Cross of The Dream of the Rood" Philological Quarterly 76.1 (1997): 1-18.
