= White Anglo-Saxon Protestants =

Sociological category in the US, Canada, and Australia

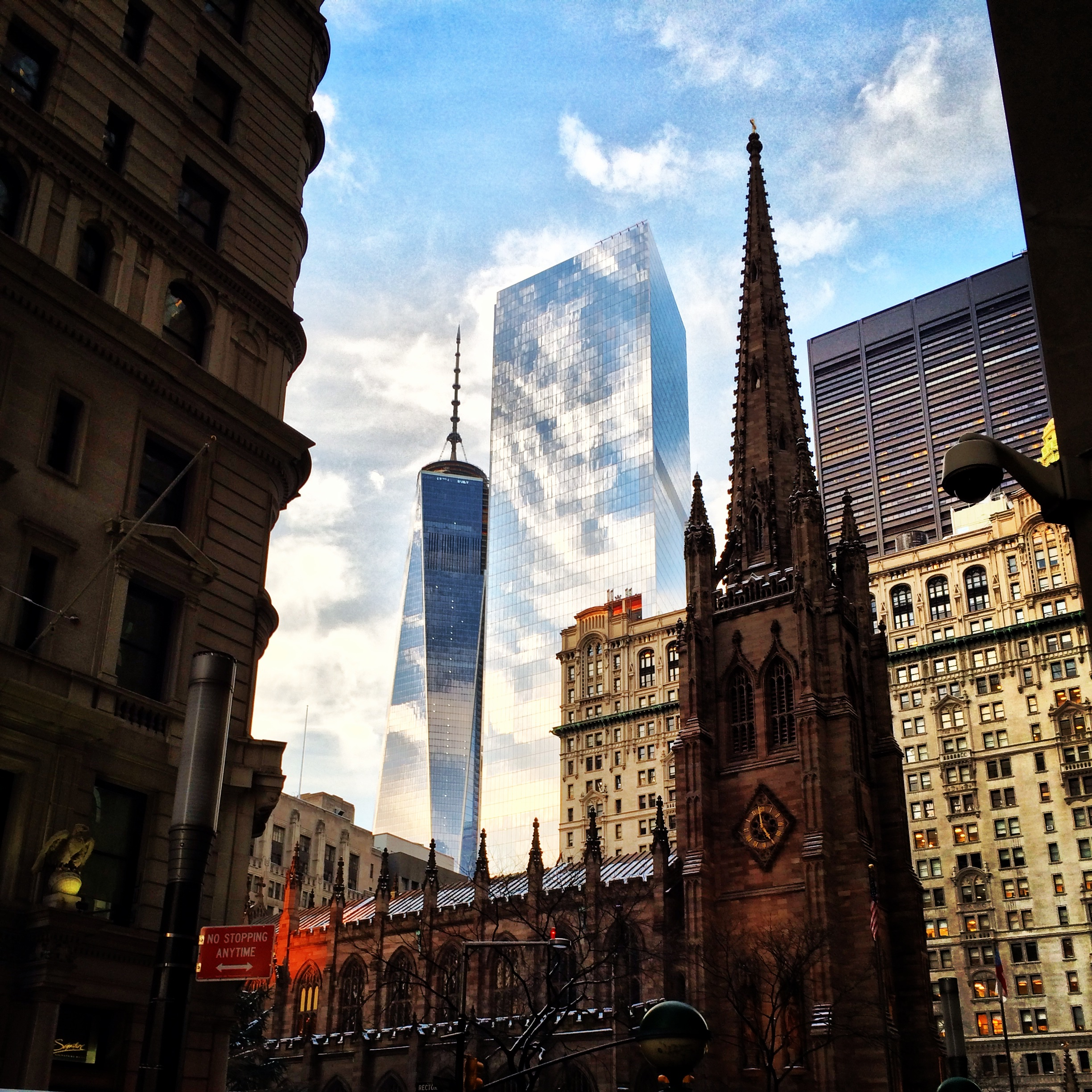
The old and prominent Trinity Church in Manhattan facing the moneyed center of Wall Street has been seen as embodying the prominence of White Anglo-Saxon Protestant culture in the United States.

In the United States, White Anglo-Saxon Protestant (WASP) is a sociological term used to describe white, upper class, Protestant Americans, usually of English descent, who are generally part of the white dominant culture. Some sociologists and commentators use WASP more broadly to include all White Protestant Americans of Northwestern European and Northern European ancestry. It was seen to be in exclusionary contrast to Catholics, Jews, Irish, immigrants, southern or eastern Europeans, and the non-White. WASPs have dominated American society, culture, and politics for most of the history of the United States. Critics have disparaged them as "The Establishment". The term often correlates to Old Stock Americans of British ancestry (an identity rooted in Anglo-Saxonism) or more specifically the original ones who are descended from the principal 17th-century English settlers who formed the bedrock and demographic core of the nation. Although the social influence of wealthy WASPs has declined since the 1960s, the group continues to play a central role in American finance, politics, and philanthropy.

WASP is also used for similar elites in Australia, New Zealand, and Canada. The 1998 Random House Unabridged Dictionary says the term is "sometimes disparaging and offensive".

== Naming and definition ==
In the early Middle Ages, Anglian and Saxon kingdoms were established over most of England ('land of the Angles'). After the Norman Conquest in 1066, Anglo-Saxon refers to the pre-invasion English people. Political scientist Andrew Hacker used the term WASP in 1957, with W standing for 'wealthy' rather than 'white' (since 'white Anglo-Saxon' is a tautology). The P formed a humorous epithet to imply "waspishness" or someone likely to make sharp, slightly cruel remarks. Describing the class of Americans that held "national power in its economic, political, and social aspects", Hacker wrote:

These 'old' Americans possess, for the most part, some common characteristics. First of all, they are 'WASPs'—in the cocktail party jargon of the sociologists. That is, they are wealthy, they are Anglo-Saxon in origin, and they are Protestants (and disproportionately Episcopalian).

An earlier usage appeared in the African-American newspaper The New York Amsterdam News in 1948, when author Stetson Kennedy wrote:

In America, we find the WASPs (White Anglo-Saxon Protestants) ganging up to take their frustrations out on whatever minority group happens to be handy — whether Negro, Catholic, Jewish, Japanese or whatnot.

The term was later popularized by sociologist and University of Pennsylvania professor E. Digby Baltzell, himself a WASP, in his 1964 book The Protestant Establishment: Aristocracy and Caste in America. Baltzell stressed the closed or caste-like characteristic of the group by arguing that "There is a crisis in American leadership in the middle of the twentieth century that is partly due, I think, to the declining authority of an establishment which is now based on an increasingly castelike White-Anglo Saxon-Protestant (WASP) upper class."

Citing Gallup polling data from 1976, Kit and Frederica Konolige wrote in their 1978 book The Power of Their Glory, "As befits a church that belongs to the worldwide Anglican Communion, Episcopalianism has the United Kingdom to thank for the ancestors of fully 49 percent of its members. ... The stereotype of the White Anglo-Saxon Protestant (WASP) finds its fullest expression in the Episcopal Church."

WASP is also used in Australia and Canada for similar elites. WASPs traditionally have been associated with Episcopal (or Anglican), Presbyterian, United Methodist, Congregationalist, and other mainline Protestant denominations; however, the term has expanded to include other Protestant denominations as well.

=== Anglo-Saxon in modern usage ===
The concept of Anglo-Saxonism, and especially Anglo-Saxon Protestantism, evolved in the late 19th century, especially among American Protestant missionaries eager to transform the world. Historian Richard Kyle says:

Protestantism had not yet split into two mutually hostile camps – the liberals and fundamentalists. Of great importance, evangelical Protestantism still dominated the cultural scene. American values bore the stamp of this Anglo-Saxon Protestant ascendancy. The political, cultural, religious, and intellectual leaders of the nation were largely of a Northern European Protestant stock, and they propagated public morals compatible with their background.

Before WASP came into use in the 1960s, the term Anglo-Saxon served some of the same purposes. Like the newer term WASP, the older term Anglo-Saxon was used derisively by writers hostile to an informal alliance between Britain and the U.S. The negative connotation was especially common among Irish Americans and writers in France. Anglo-Saxon, meaning in effect the whole Anglosphere, remains a term favored by the French, used disapprovingly in contexts such as criticism of the Special Relationship of close diplomatic relations between the U.S. and the UK and complaints about perceived "Anglo-Saxon" cultural or political dominance. In December 1918, after victory in the World War, President Woodrow Wilson told a British official in London: "You must not speak of us who come over here as cousins, still less as brothers; we are neither. Neither must you think of us as Anglo-Saxons, for that term can no longer be rightly applied to the people of the United States....There are only two things which can establish and maintain closer relations between your country and mine: they are community of ideals and of interests." The term remains in use in Ireland as a term for the British or English, and sometimes in Scottish Nationalist discourse. Irish-American humorist Finley Peter Dunne popularized the ridicule of "Anglo-Saxons", even calling President Theodore Roosevelt one. Roosevelt insisted he was Dutch. "To be genuinely Irish is to challenge WASP dominance", argues California politician Tom Hayden. The depiction of the Irish in the films of John Ford was a counterpoint to WASP standards of rectitude. "The procession of rambunctious and feckless Celts through Ford's films, Irish and otherwise, was meant to cock a snoot at WASP or 'lace-curtain Irish' ideas of respectability."

In Australia, Anglo or Anglo-Saxon refers to people of English descent, while Anglo-Celtic includes people of Irish, Welsh, and Scottish descent.

In France, Anglo-Saxon refers to the combined impact of Britain and the United States on European affairs. Charles de Gaulle repeatedly sought to "rid France of Anglo-Saxon influence". The term is used with more nuance in discussions by French writers on French decline, especially as an alternative model to which France should aspire, how France should adjust to its two most prominent global competitors, and how it should deal with social and economic modernization.

Outside of Anglophone countries, the term Anglo-Saxon and its translations are used to refer to the Anglophone peoples and societies of Britain, the United States, and countries such as Australia, Canada, and New Zealand. Variations include the German Angelsachsen, French le modèle anglo-saxon, Spanish anglosajón, Dutch Angelsaksisch model and Italian Paesi anglosassoni.

=== Anglo-Saxon supremacy ===
In the nineteenth century, Anglo-Saxons was often used as a synonym for all people of English descent and sometimes more generally, for all the English-speaking peoples of the world. It was often used in implying superiority, much to the annoyance of outsiders. For example, American clergyman Josiah Strong boasted in 1890:

In 1700 this race numbered less than 6,000,000 souls. In 1800, Anglo-Saxons (I use the term somewhat broadly to include all English-speaking peoples) had increased to about 20,500,000, and now, in 1890, they number more than 120,000,000.

In 1893, Strong envisioned a future "new era" of triumphant Anglo-Saxonism:

Is it not reasonable to believe that this race is destined to dispossess many weaker ones, assimilate others, and mould the remainder until... it has Anglo-Saxonized mankind?

=== Other European ethnicities ===
The popular and sociological usage of the term WASP has sometimes expanded to include not just "Anglo-Saxon" or English-American elites but also American people of other Protestant Northwestern European origin, including Protestant Dutch Americans, Scottish Americans, Welsh Americans, German Americans, Ulster Scots or "Scotch-Irish" Americans, and Scandinavian Americans. A 1969 Time article stated, "purists like to confine Wasps to descendants of the British Isles; less exacting analysts are willing to throw in Scandinavians, Netherlanders and Germans." The sociologist Charles H. Anderson writes, "Scandinavians are second-class WASPs" but know it is "better to be a second-class WASP than a non-WASP".

Sociologists William Thompson and Joseph Hickey described the further expansion of the term's meaning:

The term WASP has many meanings. In sociology it reflects that segment of the U.S. population that founded the nation and traced their heritages to...Northwestern Europe. The term...has become more inclusive. To many people, WASP now includes most 'white' people who are not ... members of any minority group.

Apart from Protestant English, British, German, Dutch, and Scandinavian Americans, other ethnic groups frequently included under the label WASP include Americans of French Huguenot descent, Protestant Americans of Germanic European descent in general, and established Protestant American families of a "mix" of or of "vague" Germanic Northwestern European heritages.

== Culture ==
Historically, as they comprised most of the primary 17th century settlers, the early Anglo-Protestant settlers in the seventeenth century were the most successful group, culturally, economically, and politically, and they maintained their dominance until the late twentieth century at the earliest. Numbers of the most wealthy and affluent American families, such as Boston Brahmin, First Families of Virginia, Old Philadelphians, Tidewater, and Lowcountry gentry or old money, were WASPs. Commitment to the ideals of the Enlightenment meant that they sought to assimilate newcomers from outside of the British Isles, but few were interested in adopting a Pan-European identity for the nation, much less turning it into a global melting pot. However, in the early 1900s, liberal progressives and modernists began promoting more inclusive ideals for what the national identity of the United States should be. While the more traditionalist segments of society continued to maintain their Anglo-Protestant ethnocultural traditions, universalism and cosmopolitanism started gaining favor among the elites. These ideals became institutionalized after the Second World War, and ethnic minorities started moving towards institutional parity with the once dominant Anglo-Protestants.

The White Anglo-Saxon Protestant cultural preferences for classical music and traditional religious architecture had defined American high culture and religious life in the United States.

=== Education ===
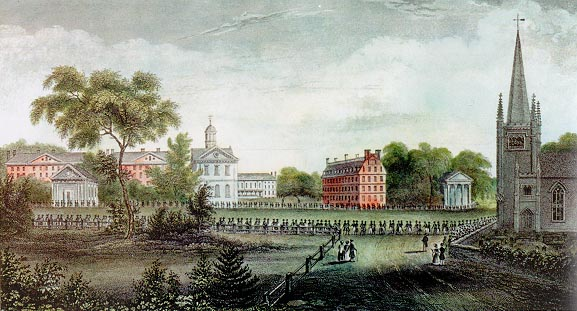
Harvard College was primarily white and Protestant into the 20th century.

Some of the first colleges and universities in America, including Harvard, Yale, Princeton, Brown, Rutgers, Columbia, Dartmouth, Pennsylvania, Duke, Boston University, Williams, Bowdoin, Middlebury, and Amherst, all were founded by mainline Protestants.

Expensive, private prep schools and universities have historically been associated with WASPs. Colleges such as the Ivy League, the Little Ivies, and the Seven Sisters colleges are particularly intertwined with the culture. Until roughly World War II, Ivy League universities were composed largely of white Protestants. While admission to these schools is generally based upon merit, many of these universities give a legacy preference for the children of alumni in order to link elite families (and their wealth) with the school. These legacy admissions have allowed for the continuation of WASP influence on important sectors of the US.

Members of Protestant denominations associated with WASPs have some of the highest proportions of advanced degrees. Examples include the Episcopal Church, with 76% of those polled having some college education, and the Presbyterian Church, with 64%.

According to Scientific Elite: Nobel Laureates in the United States by Harriet Zuckerman, between 1901 and 1972, 72% of American Nobel Prize laureates have come from a Protestant background, mostly from Episcopalian, Presbyterian or Lutheran background, while Protestants made up roughly 67% of the US population during that period. Of Nobel prizes awarded to Americans between 1901 and 1972, 84.2% of those in Chemistry, 60% in Medicine, and 58.6% in Physics were awarded to Protestants.

=== Religion ===
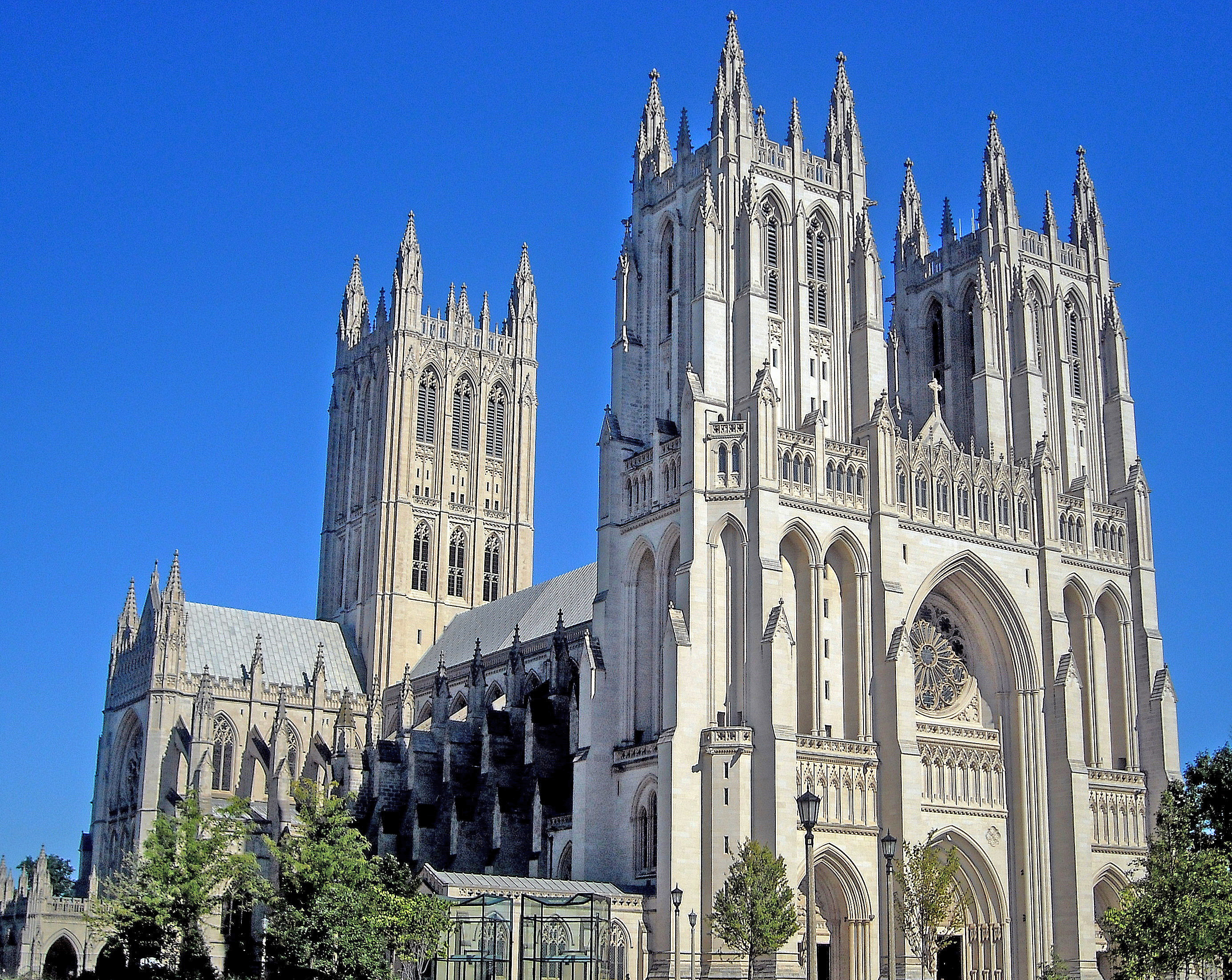
Washington National Cathedral, the Episcopal cathedral in Washington, D.C.

The White Anglo-Saxon Protestant upper class has largely held church membership in the Protestant denominations of Christianity, chiefly the Presbyterian, Episcopalian, and Congregationalist traditions.

Citing Gallup polling data from 1976, Kit and Frederica Konolige wrote in their 1978 book The Power of Their Glory, "As befits a church that belongs to the worldwide Anglican Communion, Episcopalianism has the United Kingdom to thank for the ancestors of fully 49 percent of its members. ... The stereotype of the White Anglo-Saxon Protestant (WASP) finds its fullest expression in the Episcopal Church."

=== Politics ===
From 1854 until about 1964, white Protestants were predominantly Republicans. More recently, the group is split more evenly between the Republican and Democratic parties.

=== Wealth ===
Episcopalians and Presbyterians are among the wealthiest religious groups and were formerly disproportionately represented in American business, law, and politics. Old money in the United States was typically associated with WASP status, particularly with the Episcopal and Presbyterian Church. Some of the wealthiest and most affluent American families such as the Vanderbilts, Astors, Rockefellers, Du Ponts, Roosevelts, Forbes, Fords, Mellons, Whitneys, Morgans, and Harrimans are white primarily mainline Protestant families.

According to a 2014 study by the Pew Research Center, Episcopalians ranked as the third wealthiest religious group in the United States, with 35% of Episcopalians living in households with incomes of at least $100,000. Presbyterians ranked as the fourth most financially successful religious group in the United States, with 32% of Presbyterians living in households with incomes of at least $100,000.

=== Location ===
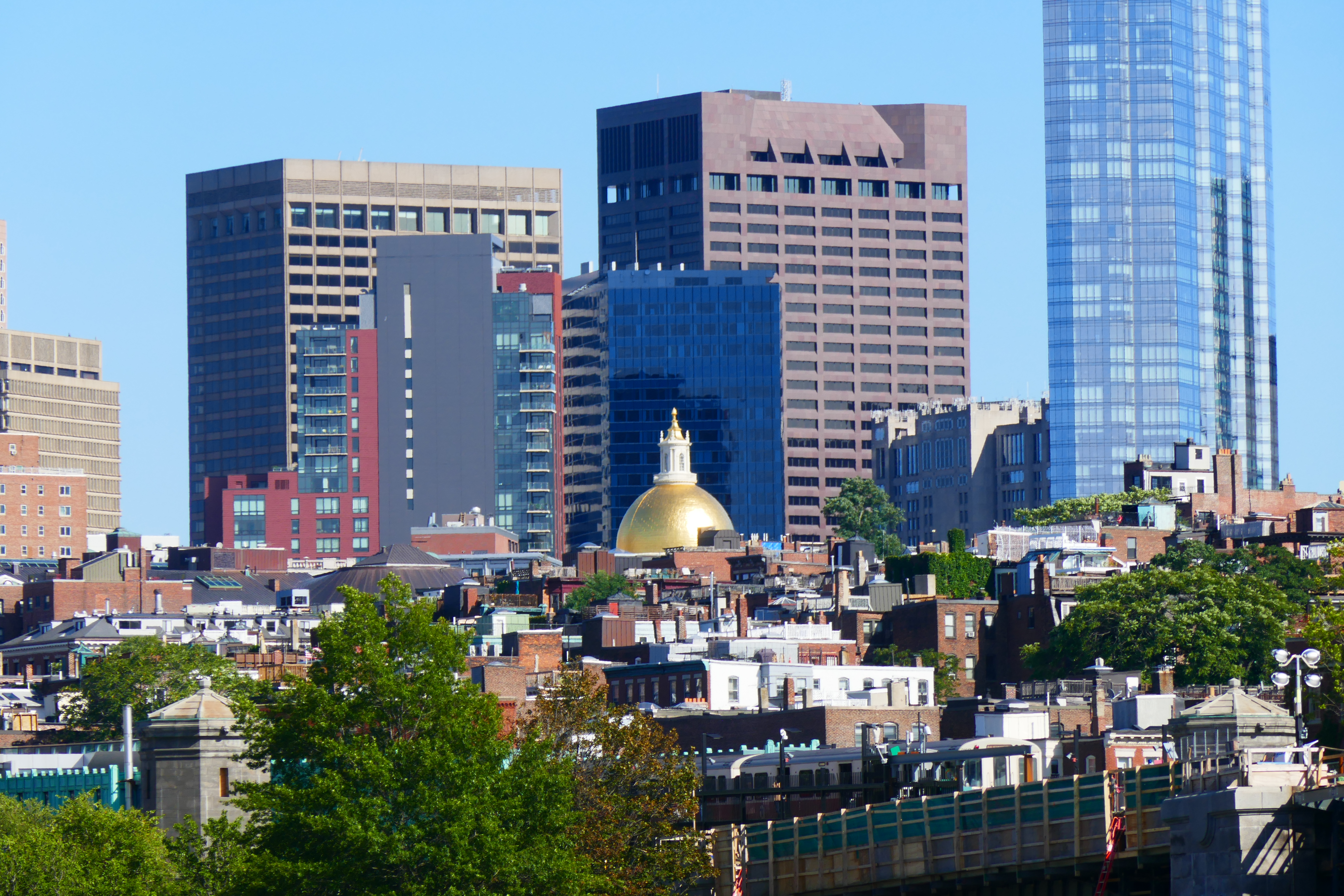
Beacon Hill, Boston: a preeminent Boston Brahmin neighborhood.

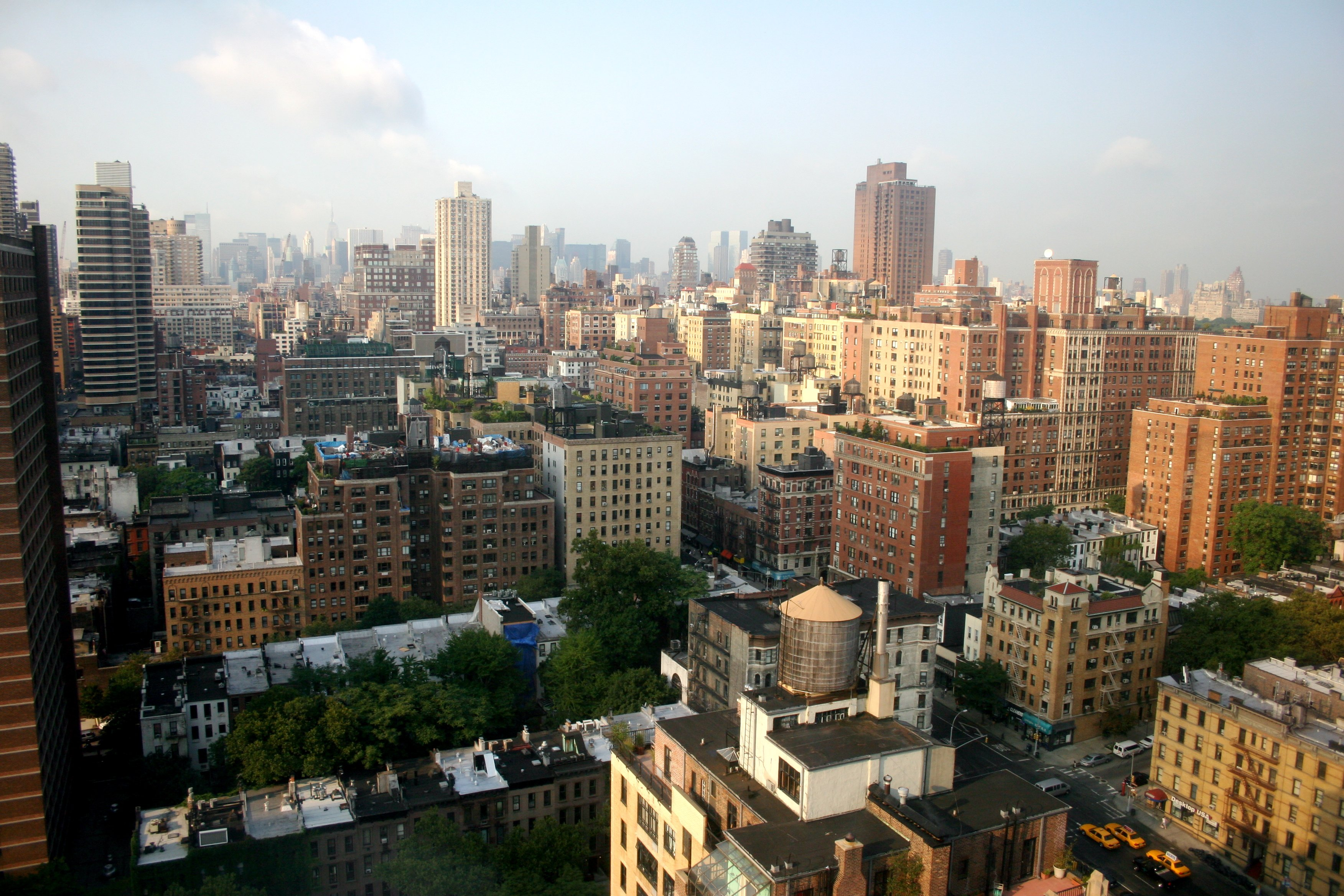
View of Manhattan's Upper East Side, which has traditionally been dominated by WASP families

The Boston Brahmins, who were regarded as the nation's social and cultural elites, were often associated with the American upper class, Harvard University, and the Episcopal Church.

Like other sociological groups, WASPs tend to concentrate near each other. These areas are often exclusive and associated with top schools, high incomes, well-established church communities, and high real-estate values. For example, in the Detroit area, WASPs predominantly possessed the wealth that came from the new automotive industry. After the 1967 Detroit riot, they tended to congregate in the Grosse Pointe suburbs. In the Chicago metropolitan area, white Protestants primarily reside in the North Shore suburbs, the Barrington area in the northwest suburbs, and in Kane County, Illinois and DuPage County in the western suburbs. Traditionally, the Upper East Side in Manhattan has been dominated by wealthy White Anglo-Saxon Protestant families.

=== Social values ===
David Brooks, a columnist for The New York Times who attended an Episcopal prep school, writes that WASPs took pride in "good posture, genteel manners, personal hygiene, pointless discipline, the ability to sit still for long periods of time." According to the essayist Joseph Epstein, WASPs developed a style of understated quiet leadership.

A common practice of WASP families is presenting their daughters of marriageable age (traditionally at the age of 17 or 18 years old) at a débutante ball, such as the International Debutante Ball at the Waldorf Astoria Hotel in New York City.

=== Social Register ===
America's social elite was a small, closed group. The leadership was well-known to the readers of newspaper society pages, but in larger cities it was hard to remember everyone, or to keep track of the new debutantes and marriages. The solution was the Social Register, which listed the names and addresses of about 1 percent of the population. Most were WASPs, and they included families who mingled at the same private clubs, attended the right teas and cotillions, worshipped together at prestige churches, funded the proper charities, lived in exclusive neighborhoods, and sent their daughters to finishing schools and their sons away to prep schools. In the heyday of WASP dominance, the Social Register delineated high society. According to The New York Times, its influence had faded by the late 20th century:

Once, the Social Register was a juggernaut in New York social circles... Nowadays, however, with the waning of the WASP elite as a social and political force, the register's role as an arbiter of who counts and who doesn't is almost an anachronism. In Manhattan, where charity galas are at the center of the social season, the organizing committees are studded with luminaries from publishing, Hollywood and Wall Street and family lineage is almost irrelevant.

=== Fashion ===
In 2007, The New York Times reported that there was a rising interest in the WASP culture. In their review of Susanna Salk's A Privileged Life: Celebrating WASP Style, they stated that Salk "is serious about defending the virtues of WASP values, and their contribution to American culture."

By the 1980s, brands such as Lacoste and Ralph Lauren, which ironically are of French and Jewish extraction respectively and their logos became associated with the preppy fashion style which was associated with WASP culture.

== Social and political influence ==
The term WASP became associated with the American upper class due to over-representation of WASPs in the upper echelons of society. Until the mid–20th century, industries such as banks, insurance, railroads, utilities, and manufacturing were dominated by WASPs.

The Founding Fathers of the United States were mostly educated, well-to-do, of British ancestry, and Protestants. According to a study of the biographies of signers of the Declaration of Independence by Caroline Robbins:

The Signers came for the most part from an educated elite, were residents of older settlements, and belonged with a few exceptions to a moderately well-to-do class representing only a fraction of the population. Native or born overseas, they were of British stock and of the Protestant faith.

Catholics in the Northeast and the Midwest—mostly immigrants and their descendants from Ireland and Germany as well as southern and eastern Europe—came to dominate Democratic Party politics in big cities through the ward boss system. Catholic politicians were often the target of WASP political hostility.

Political scientist Eric Kaufmann argues that "the 1920s marked the high tide of WASP control". In 1965, Canadian sociologist John Porter, in The Vertical Mosaic, argued that British origins were disproportionately represented in the higher echelons of Canadian class, income, political power, the clergy, the media, etc. However, more recently, Canadian scholars have traced the decline of the WASP elite.

=== Post–World War II ===
According to Ralph E. Pyle:

A number of analysts have suggested that WASP dominance of the institutional order has become a thing of the past. The accepted wisdom is that after World War II, the selection of individuals for leadership positions was increasingly based on factors such as motivation and training rather than ethnicity and social lineage.

Many reasons have been given for the decline of WASP power, and books have been written detailing it. Self-imposed diversity incentives opened the country's most elite schools. The GI Bill brought higher education to new ethnic arrivals, who found middle class jobs in the postwar economic expansion. Nevertheless, white Protestants remain influential in the country's cultural, political, and economic elite. Scholars typically agree that the group's influence has waned since 1945, with the growing influence of other ethnic groups.

After 1945, Catholics and Jews made strong inroads in getting jobs in the federal civil service, which was once dominated by those from Protestant backgrounds, especially the Department of State. Georgetown University, a Catholic school, made a systematic effort to place graduates in diplomatic career tracks. By the 1990s, there were "roughly the same proportion of WASPs, Catholics, and Jews at the elite levels of the federal civil service, and a greater proportion of Jewish and Catholic elites among corporate lawyers." The political scientist Theodore P. Wright Jr., argues that while the Anglo ethnicity of the U.S. presidents from Richard Nixon through George W. Bush is evidence for the continued cultural dominance of WASPs, assimilation and social mobility, along with the ambiguity of the term, has led the WASP class to survive only by "incorporating other groups [so] that it is no longer the same group" that existed in the mid-20th century.

Very few Jewish lawyers were hired by White Anglo-Saxon Protestant ("WASP") upscale white-shoe law firms, but they started their own. The WASP dominance in law ended when a number of major Jewish law firms attained elite status in dealing with top-ranked corporations. Most white-shoe firms also excluded Roman Catholics. As late as 1950 there was not a single large Jewish law firm in New York City. However, by 1965 six of the 20 largest firms were Jewish; by 1980 four of the ten largest were Jewish.

Two famous confrontations signifying a decline in WASP dominance were the 1952 Senate election in Massachusetts, in which John F. Kennedy, a Catholic of Irish descent, defeated WASP Henry Cabot Lodge Jr., and the 1964 challenge by Arizona Senator Barry Goldwater—an Episcopalian who had solid WASP credentials through his mother, but whose father was Jewish, and was seen by some as part of the Jewish community—to Nelson Rockefeller and the Eastern Republican establishment, which led to the liberal Rockefeller Republican wing of the party being marginalized by the 1980s, overwhelmed by the dominance of Southern and Western conservatives. However, asking "Is the WASP leader a dying breed?", journalist Nina Strochlic in 2012 pointed to eleven WASP top politicians, ending with Republicans George H. W. Bush, elected in 1988, his son George W. Bush, elected in 2000 and 2004, and John McCain, who was nominated but defeated in 2008. Mary Kenny argues that Barack Obama, although famous as the first Black president, exemplifies highly controlled "unemotional delivery" and "rational detachment" characteristic of WASP personality traits. Indeed, he attended upper class schools such as Columbia and Harvard, and was raised by his WASP mother Ann Dunham and the Dunham grandparents in a family that dates to Jonathan Singletary Dunham, born in Massachusetts in 1640. Inderjeet Parmar and Mark Ledwidge argue that Obama pursued a typically WASP-inspired foreign policy of liberal internationalism.

In the 1970s, a Fortune magazine study found one-in-five of the country's largest businesses and one-in-three of its largest banks was run by an Episcopalian. More recent studies indicate a still-disproportionate, though somewhat reduced, influence of WASPs among economic elites.

The reversal of WASP fortune was exemplified by the Supreme Court. Historically, the great majority of its justices were of WASP heritage. The exceptions included seven Catholics and two Jews. Since the 1960s, an increasing number of non-WASP justices have been appointed to the Court. From 2010 to 2017, the Court had no Protestant members, until the appointment of Neil Gorsuch in 2017.

The University of California, Berkeley, once a WASP stronghold, has changed radically: only 30% of its undergraduates in 2007 were of European origin (including WASPs and all other Europeans), and 63% of undergraduates at the university were from immigrant families (where at least one parent was an immigrant), especially Asian. Once also a WASP bastion, as of 2010 Harvard University enrolled 9,289 non-Hispanic white students (44%, of which approximately 30% were Jewish), 2,658 Asian American students (13%), 1,239 Hispanic students (6%), and 1,198 African American students (6%).

A significant shift of American economic activity toward the Sun Belt during the latter part of the 20th century and an increasingly globalized economy have also contributed to the decline in power held by Northeastern WASPs. James D. Davidson et al. argued in 1995 that while WASPs were no longer solitary among the American elite, members of the Patrician class remained markedly prevalent within the current power structure.

Other analysts have argued that the extent of the decrease in WASP dominance has been overstated. In response to increasing claims of fading WASP dominance, Davidson, using data on American elites in political and economic spheres, concluded in 1994 that, while the WASP and Protestant establishment had lost some of its earlier prominence, WASPs and Protestants were still vastly overrepresented among America's elite.

In August 2012 the New York Times, reviewed the religion of the fifteen top national leaders: the presidential and vice-presidential nominees, the Supreme Court justices, the House Speaker, and the Senate majority leader. There were nine Catholics (six justices, both vice-presidential candidates, and the Speaker), three Jews (all from the Supreme Court), two Mormons (including the Republican presidential nominee Mitt Romney) and one African-American Protestant (incumbent President Barack Obama). There were no white Protestants.

=== Hostile epithet ===
In the 21st century, WASP is often applied as a derogatory label to those with social privilege who are perceived to be snobbish and exclusive, such as being members of restrictive private social clubs. Kevin M. Schultz stated in 2010 that WASP is "a much-maligned class identity....Today, it signifies an elitist snoot."

However, others have defended WASP hegemony in the United States. According to Richard Brookhiser the "uptight, bland, and elitist" stereotype obscures the "classic WASP ideals of industry, public service, family duty, and conscience to revitalize the nation." Likewise, conservative writer Joseph Epstein suggested that the United States was better off with a WASP ruling class, which he views as now being ruled by an ethnically diverse elite, which he describes as the "self-involved, over-schooled products of modern meritocracy".

== In media ==
American films, including Annie Hall and Meet the Parents, have used the conflicts between WASP families and urban Jewish families for comedic effect.

The 1939 Broadway play Arsenic and Old Lace, later adapted into a Hollywood film released in 1944, ridiculed the old American elite. The play and film depict "old-stock British Americans" a decade before they were tagged as WASPS.

The playwright A. R. Gurney (1930–2017), himself of WASP heritage, has written a series of plays that have been called "penetratingly witty studies of the WASP ascendancy in retreat". Gurney told the Washington Post in 1982:

WASPs do have a culture – traditions, idiosyncrasies, quirks, particular signals and totems we pass on to one another. But the WASP culture, or at least that aspect of the culture I talk about, is enough in the past so that we can now look at it with some objectivity, smile at it, and even appreciate some of its values. There was a closeness of family, a commitment to duty, to stoic responsibility, which I think we have to say weren't entirely bad.

In Gurney's play The Cocktail Hour (1988), a lead character tells her playwright son that theater critics "don't like us... They resent us. They think we're all Republicans, all superficial and all alcoholics. Only the latter is true."

Filmmaker Whit Stillman, whose godfather was E. Digby Baltzell, has made films dealing primarily with WASP characters and subjects. Stillman has been called the "WASP Woody Allen". His debut 1990 film Metropolitan tells the story of a group of college-age Manhattan socialites during débutante season. A recurring theme of the film is the declining power of the old Protestant élite.

== See also ==
- American gentry – Wealthy landowners in the colonial United States
- Anglo-Saxonism
- African-American upper class
- Diversity, equity, and inclusion
- Heritage Americans
- Non-Hispanic whites
