= Authoritarian enclave =

Non-democratic subunit of a democracy

An authoritarian enclave is a non-democratic subunit of a democratic system. It may be an administrative division of a state or a ministry (such as the military, education or media).

== Subnational enclaves ==
National democratization does not necessarily produce the same degree of democracy throughout a country's territory. In federal systems, states or provinces can use their control over constitutions, electoral rules and political institutions to preserve arrangements that differ from those at the national level. Methods of restricting competition include manipulating electoral rules, undermining the independence of courts and electoral authorities, and limiting opposition organization and expression.

Political scientist Edward L. Gibson uses the concept of boundary control to explain struggles over subnational democratization. A central issue is whether conflicts remain confined to a province or become matters of national politics. His comparative analysis examines conflicts in Oaxaca, Mexico, and Santiago del Estero, Argentina, in 2004.

The survival of undemocratic subnational governments can also depend on national political alliances. National politicians may benefit from their continued rule, while representatives of such jurisdictions can exchange support for federal legislation for nonintervention in their internal political arrangements.
